= List of National Lampoon films =

During the 1970s and early 1980s, a few films were made as spin-offs from the original National Lampoon magazine, using some of the magazine's creative staff to put together the outlines and scripts, and were cast using some of the same actors that performed in The National Lampoon Radio Hour and the stage show National Lampoon's Lemmings.

== History ==
The first National Lampoon film was Animal House (1978). Starring John Belushi and written by Doug Kenney, Harold Ramis and Chris Miller, Animal House became one of the highest-grossing comedy films of all time. Produced on a low budget, it was so enormously profitable that from that point onward for the next two decades, the name "National Lampoon" applied to the title of a movie was considered to be a valuable selling point in and of itself.

There is considerable ambiguity about what constitutes a "National Lampoon" film because, after the success of Animal House, a large number of movies were subsequently made that had "National Lampoon" as part of the title, and in some cases used actors that had been associated with other National Lampoon productions. Many of these so-called "National Lampoon" movies were unrelated projects, because during most of the 1980s and the 1990s, the name "National Lampoon" could simply be licensed on a one-time basis, by any company, for a fee. There are also cases where a film, originally released outside the US under one title, has had "National Lampoon's" added to the title for US release; for example the 2004 Canadian release Going the Distance, which was only branded a National Lampoon film in its American theatrical and DVD releases.

== Films ==
=== Original company ===
- National Lampoon's Animal House (1978)
- National Lampoon's Movie Madness (1982)
- National Lampoon's Class Reunion (1982)
- National Lampoon's Vacation (1983)
- National Lampoon's Joy of Sex (1984)
- National Lampoon's European Vacation (1985)
- National Lampoon's Christmas Vacation (1989)

=== J2 Communications ===
- National Lampoon's Loaded Weapon 1 (1993)
- National Lampoon's Senior Trip (1995)
- National Lampoon's Vegas Vacation (1997)
- National Lampoon's Golf Punks (1998)
- National Lampoon's Van Wilder (2002)
- National Lampoon's Repli-Kate (2002)
- National Lampoon's Blackball (2003)
- National Lampoon Presents: Jake's Booty Call (2003)

=== National Lampoon, Inc. ===
- National Lampoon's Gold Diggers (2003)
- National Lampoon Presents Dorm Daze (2003)
- National Lampoon's Barely Legal (2003)
- National Lampoon's Going the Distance (2004)
- National Lampoon's The Almost Guys (2004)
- National Lampoon's Adam & Eve (2005)
- National Lampoon Presents: Cattle Call (2006)
- National Lampoon Presents Electric Apricot: Quest For Festeroo (2006)
- National Lampoon's Pucked (2006)
- National Lampoon's Van Wilder: The Rise of Taj (2006)
- National Lampoon's The Beach Party at the Threshold of Hell (2006)
- National Lampoon's Stoned Age (2007)
- National Lampoon's Totally Baked: A Potumentary (2007)
- National Lampoon's Bag Boy (2007)
- National Lampoon Presents: One, Two, Many (2008)
- National Lampoon Presents: RoboDoc (2008)
- National Lampoon's Transylmania (2009)
- National Lampoon Presents: Endless Bummer (2009)
- National Lampoon's Cheerleaders Must Die! (2010)
- National Lampoon's Dirty Movie (2010)
- National Lampoon's Ratko: The Dictator's Son (2010)
- National Lampoon's 301: The Legend of Awesomest Maximus (2011)
- National Lampoon's Snatched (2011)
- National Lampoon Presents Surf Party (2013)
- National Lampoon: Drunk Stoned Brilliant Dead (2015)

== Made-for-television ==
Original company

- Disco Beaver from Outer Space (1979)

J2 Communications

- National Lampoon's Attack of the 5 Ft. 2 In. Women (1994)
- National Lampoon's Favorite Deadly Sins (1995)
- National Lampoon's Dad's Week Off (1997)
- National Lampoon's The Don's Analyst (1997)
- National Lampoon's Men in White (1998)

National Lampoon, Inc.

- National Lampoon's Thanksgiving Family Reunion (2003)
- National Lampoon's Christmas Vacation 2: Cousin Eddie's Island Adventure (2003)
- National Lampoon Live: Down & Dirty (2004)
- Professor Pepper's School of Good Stuff (2006)
- Wannabes (2006)

== Video releases ==
Original company

- National Lampoon's Lemmings (1973)
- O.C. and Stiggs (1985)
- National Lampoon's Class of '86 (1986)

J2 Communications

- National Lampoon's Last Resort (1994)

National Lampoon, Inc.

- National Lampoon Presents: Lost Reality (2004)
- The Girls of National Lampoon's Strip Poker (2005)
- National Lampoon Presents: Lost Reality 2 - More of the Worst (2005)
- National Lampoon's Boobies (2005)
- National Lampoon's Teed Off (2005)
- National Lampoon's Teed Off: Behind the Tees (2005)
- National Lampoon's Teed Off Too (2006)
- National Lampoon's Dorm Daze 2: College at Sea (2006)
- National Lampoon's Pledge This! (2006)
- Hard Four (2007)
- National Lampoon's Spring Break (2007)
- National Lampoon's TV: The Movie (2007)
- Van Wilder: Freshman Year (2009)
- RoboDoc Dissected: The Making of RoboDoc (2009)
- Dracula's Daughters vs. the Space Brains (2010)
- Sex Tax: Based on a True Story (2010)
- Night of the Little Dead (2011)
- Another Dirty Movie (2012)

== See also ==
- National Lampoon's Vacation (film series)
