= Drunk Stoned Brilliant Dead (film) =

2015 film by Douglas Tirola

Drunk Stoned Brilliant Dead: The Story of the National Lampoon
- One version of the film poster
- Directed by: Douglas Tirola
- Written by: Mark Monroe; Douglas Tirola
- Produced by: Susan Bedusa; Douglas Tirola
- Cinematography: Sean Price Williams
- Edited by: Joseph Hrings; G. Jesse Martinez
- Music by: Bryce Jacobs
- Production company: 4th Row Films
- Distributed by: Magnolia Pictures
- Release date: January 25, 2015 (Sundance)
- Running time: 93 minutes
- Country: United States
- Language: English

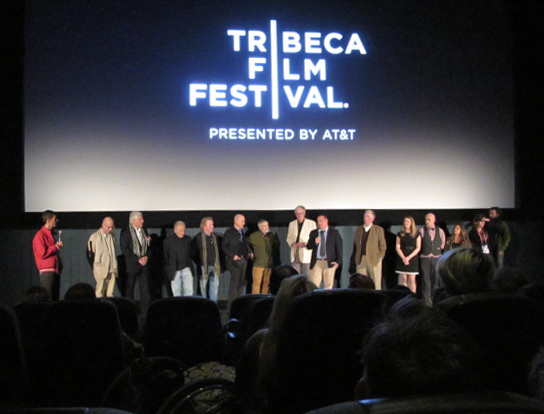
After the April 2015 Tribeca Film Festival showing, Doug Tirola (with blue shirt and tie) onstage with some of the film's staff to his left, and some of the original National Lampoon people to his right: Brian McConnachie in a white jacket, Sean Kelly, Rick Meyerowitz, Tony Hendra, Sam Gross, Jerry Taylor, and Ed Subitzky in beige.

Drunk Stoned Brilliant Dead: The Story of the National Lampoon is a 2015 American documentary film directed by Douglas Tirola. The film is about National Lampoon magazine, and how the magazine and its empire of spin-offs changed the course of comedy and humor.

The title of the film is very similar to the title of a 2010 book about National Lampoon: Drunk Stoned Brilliant Dead: The Writers and Artists Who Made National Lampoon Insanely Great, by Rick Meyerowitz. The film refers to some of the same material, and features work from some of the same contributors, but the film is not actually based on the book.

== Synopsis / cast ==
The film features new interviews with National Lampoon staff members and other notable figures who were fans of the magazine, as well as much never-before-seen archival material and illustrations from the magazine, many of which have been animated.

The film is "bursting with glimpses of the magazine's contents". The film also features numerous new interviews, including those with Chevy Chase, John Landis, Judd Apatow, Kevin Bacon, Tim Matheson, John Goodman, Billy Bob Thornton, Meat Loaf, Christopher Buckley, Henry Beard, Matty Simmons, Tony Hendra, P. J. O'Rourke, Chris Miller, Anne Beatts, Mike Reiss, Sean Kelly, Brian McConnachie, Michael Gross, Janis Hirsch, Chris Cerf, Peter Kleinman, Judith Belushi Pisano, Rick Meyerowitz, Ivan Reitman, Bruce McCall, Al Jean, Beverly D'Angelo, Ed Subitzky, Sam Gross, Jerry Taylor, and many others, as well as archival footage of staffers and Lampoon performers, including John Belushi, Gilda Radner, Doug Kenney and Michael O'Donoghue.

== Poster(s) ==
Both of the two posters for the film were drawn by Rick Meyerowitz. One is deliberately reminiscent of the original poster that Meyerowitz drew for the 1978 comedy Animal House, more correctly known as National Lampoon's Animal House, starring John Belushi. In the new film poster, instead of the fictional Delta Tau Chi House, the building portrayed is the National Lampoon magazine's headquarters, which were at 635 Madison Avenue in Manhattan.

Another poster shows Rick Meyerowitz's piece Mona Gorilla, a parody of the Mona Lisa.

Alternate advertising artwork features a reproduction of the famous but controversial cover of the January 1973 "Death" issue of the National Lampoon. Retaining the photo of the man holding a gun to a dog's head, the words "Buy This Magazine" in the original caption "If You Don't Buy This Magazine, We'll Kill This Dog" has been changed to "See This Documentary". The cover is also referenced in the above-mentioned poster by an illustration of the dog. However, in this case, the dog is holding a gun to its own head while holding a sign saying "At the end of my trope", a pun on the saying "At the end of my rope".

== Release ==
The film was shown at the 2015 Sundance Film Festival and at the 2015 Tribeca Film Festival in New York City on 16 April. The premiere was at the IFC Center in Greenwich Village, New York City, on the evening of September 25, 2015.

The film was released on Blu-ray/DVD by Magnolia Home Entertainment in April 2016.

== Reception ==
On the review aggregator website Rotten Tomatoes, 88% of 65 critics' reviews are positive, with an average rating of 7.4/10. The website's consensus reads: "Drunk Stoned Brilliant Dead might not be the definitive doc National Lampoon fans are waiting for, but it's still almost as funny as the magazine in its heyday." Metacritic, which uses a weighted average, assigned the film a score of 74 out of 100, based on 18 critics, indicating "generally favorable" reviews.

Ben Kenigsberg of Variety reviewed the film positively, calling it "generous and briskly entertaining" and "a real non-fiction crowdpleaser". He also commented that director Douglas Tirola "pulls it off with style [...] skillfully presenting a huge amount of material, including animations rendered after the style of Lampoon artwork."

John DeFore of The Hollywood Reporter called it "a lively, very entertaining look at the Lampoon's unlikely empire".

Paula Bernstein of Indiewire interviewed the director, Douglas Tirola, who commented, "What I liked about the Lampoon was there was no 'going too far'."

== See also ==
- A Futile and Stupid Gesture
