= The Best of National Lampoon No. 1 =

The Best of National Lampoon No.1
- Cover artist: Rick Meyerowitz
- Language: English
- Genre: comedy, parody
- Publisher: National Lampoon
- Publication date: 1971
- Publication place: United States
- Media type: Print

The Best of National Lampoon No.1 was a humorous American book that was first published in 1971. The book was a special issue of National Lampoon magazine, so it was sold on newsstands. However, it was put out in addition to the regular issues of the magazine. The book was a "best-of", an anthology, a compilation of pieces that had already been published in the magazine, pieces that had been created by regular contributors to National Lampoon.

Several of the written pieces were created by Michael O'Donoghue, Doug Kenney, Henry Beard, Michel Choquette, Tony Hendra, and there was both writing and artwork by Arnold Roth. The cover featured the illustration "Mona Gorilla" by Rick Meyerowitz.
