= The National Lampoon Encyclopedia of Humor =

National Lampoon's Encyclopedia of Humor
- Author: Michael O'Donoghue (editor)
- Cover artist: Bernie Wrightson
- Language: English
- Genre: Parody
- Publisher: National Lampoon Magazine
- Publication date: 1973
- Publication place: United States
- Media type: Print (hardback)
- Pages: 152 pp
- ISBN: 1-59071-042-8 (2005 edition)

National Lampoon Encyclopedia of Humor is an American humor book that was first published in 1973 in hardback. It was a "special issue" of National Lampoon magazine, so it was sold on newsstands; however, it was put out in addition to the regular issues of the magazine.

The book contained all new material. It consisted of an alphabetically arranged collection of humor pieces, cartoons, and comic strips that had been especially created by many of the National Lampoon's regular contributors.

It included written pieces by Michael O'Donoghue, P. J. O'Rourke, Terry Southern, Anne Beatts, Doug Kenney, and Brian McConnachie. There were cartoons by B. Kliban, M. K. Brown, Ed Subitzky, Brian McConnachie, John Caldwell, Bobby London, and Sam Gross. In addition there was artwork by Edward Gorey, Bruce McCall, Rick Meyerowitz, and Vaughn Bode. The book also included a pull-out: the National Lampoon Map of the World.
