= National Lampoon The 199th Birthday Book =

1975 book from the National Lampoon magazine

- Author: Tony Hendra (editor)
- Cover artist: Arky & Barrett
- Language: English
- Genre: comedy, parody
- Publisher: National Lampoon
- Publication date: 1975
- Publication place: United States
- Media type: Print
- Pages: 188

National Lampoon The 199th Birthday Book: A Tribute to the United States of America, 1776–1975 was an American humor book that was issued in 1975 in paperback. Although it appears to be a regular book, it was a "special issue" of National Lampoon magazine, and therefore was sold on newsstands rather than in bookstores. The book was a collection of new material and was not an anthology of already published material.

The "199th Birthday" of the title is a reference to the fact that in 1976 the United States celebrated its 200th birthday, (the Bicentennial), thus in 1975 when this book was published the United States was 199 years old. The cover art, photographed by Arky & Barrett, was conceived and art-directed by Michael C. Gross. The front cover shows a row of four naked female models whose skin has been colored with bodypaint so they resemble the "Betsy Ross flag" with a star for the first American states, previously the Thirteen Colonies. The three naked models on the left wear dark wigs and the one on the right has a red wig, so that even their hair reflects the pattern of the flag.

The editor of the book was Tony Hendra. Contributors included Doug Kenney, P.J. O'Rourke, Michael O'Donoghue, Frank Frazetta, Sam Gross, Bobby London, Gahan Wilson, Jeff Jones, George Evans, and the illustrator Noel Sickles.
