= National Lampoon This Side of Parodies =

- Editors: Brian McConnachie, Sean Kelly
- Language: English
- Publisher: Warner Paperback Books
- Publication date: 1974
- Publication place: United States
- Media type: Print
- ISBN: 978-0446784283

National Lampoon This Side of Parodies is an American humor book that was published by Warner Paperback Books in 1974. It was a spin-off of National Lampoon magazine. The book consisted of parodies of the work of famous writers, including Richard Brautigan, Boccaccio, Raymond Chandler, Henri Charrière, John Cleland, E. E. Cummings, T. S. Eliot, Kahlil Gibran, Gerard Manley Hopkins, and Shakespeare.
