= National Lampoon's Animal House Book =

- Author: Chris Miller
- Language: English
- Genre: comedy, parody
- Publisher: National Lampoon
- Publication date: 1978
- Publication place: United States
- Media type: Print
- Pages: 131

National Lampoon's Animal House Book was an American humor book that was published in 1978 by National Lampoon magazine. The book was an illustrated novel based on the hit movie National Lampoon's Animal House. The cover illustration was the illustration for the movie poster, which was by Rick Meyerowitz. The novel was put together by Chris Miller and it was published by Twenty First Century Publications, Book Division. The book was re-issued in 2007.
