= Letters from the Editors of National Lampoon =

- Author: Brian McConnachie (editor)
- Cover artist: Rick Meyerowitz
- Language: English
- Publisher: Warner Paperback Library
- Publication date: April 1973
- Publication place: United States
- Media type: Print
- Pages: 189
- ISBN: 978-0-446-75082-0

Letters from the Editors of National Lampoon was an American humor publication from 1973. It appears to be a book, but was a "special issue" of National Lampoon magazine that was published in April 1973. It was a compilation of the best of the "Letters to the Editors" pages of the magazine. The "Letters to the Editors" were humorous and were always written by the editors, and not by readers.

It was edited by Brian McConnachie and illustrated by Rick Meyerowitz, who also did the cover illustration.
