= The Job of Sex =

1974 book by Brian McConnachie

National Lampoon The Job of Sex
- Author: Brian McConnachie (editor)
- Language: English
- Genre: Parody
- Publisher: Warner Paperback Library
- Publication date: 1974
- Publication place: United States
- Media type: Print
- Pages: 142
- ISBN: 0446764299
- OCLC: 3107304

National Lampoon The Job of Sex: a Workingman's Guide to Productive Lovemaking is a humorous book that was first published in 1974. It was a spin-off from National Lampoon magazine. The book was a parody of the 1972 book, The Joy of Sex. The parody was written by several of the National Lampoon's regular contributors, and was edited by Brian McConnachie.
