= National Lampoon The Naked and the Nude =

- Author: Brian McConnachie, Louise Gikow (Editor)
- Language: English
- Publisher: Harmony Books
- Publication date: 1976
- Publication place: United States
- Media type: Print

National Lampoon The Naked and The Nude: Hollywood and Beyond is a humor book that was published by Harmony Books in 1976 as a trade paperback. It was a spin-off of National Lampoon magazine.

The cover of the book says that it was "directed by" Brian McConnachie, an Emmy award-winning writer who was one of the major contributors to National Lampoon magazine.
