= National Lampoon The Iron On Book =

1976 book edited by Tony Hendra

- Language: English
- Genre: humor
- Publisher: National Lampoon
- Publication date: 1976
- Publication place: United States

National Lampoon The Iron On Book was an American humor book that was published in 1976. It was a "special edition" of National Lampoon magazine and as such it was sold on newsstands along with the regular monthly issue of the magazine. It was edited by Tony Hendra.

This was a book of 16 designs that the purchaser could apply to tee shirts, using an iron. The cover says, "Sixteen Original Designs For Your Chest" and is illustrated with a photograph of a beautiful girl who has tried to apply one of the designs to her white tee shirt, and ended up with it on her chest instead. The design shown is the "Mona Gorilla" by Rick Meyerowitz.
