= National Lampoon Tenth Anniversary Anthology 1970–1980 =

- Cover artist: Mara McAfee
- Language: English
- Genre: comedy, parody
- Publisher: Simon & Schuster
- Publication date: December 1979
- Publication place: United States
- Media type: Print
- Pages: 318
- ISBN: 978-0-930368-49-4

National Lampoon Tenth Anniversary Anthology 1970–1980 was an American humor book that was published in hardback in December 1979 by Simon & Schuster. Although it appeared to be a regular book, it was a "special issue" of National Lampoon magazine. It was available for purchase on newsstands, not in bookstores. The National Lampoon "special issues" were published in addition to the 12 regular monthly issues of the magazine.

The book was an anthology that consisted of humor pieces, cartoons, and comic strips that were created by many of the National Lampoon's regular contributors.

The book was rapidly re-issued, this time published by National Lampoon and split into two volumes in paperback. The first volume, National Lampoon Tenth Anniversary Anthology 1970–1980 Volume I was published in 1979, and the second volume, National Lampoon Tenth Anniversary Anthology 1970–1980 Volume II came out in 1980.
