= National Lampoon The Book of Books =

National Lampoon's Book of Books
- Language: English
- Genre: Parody
- Publisher: Simon & Schuster
- Publication date: 1979
- Publication place: United States
- Media type: Print (hardback)

National Lampoon Book of Books was an American humor book that was published in 1979 in hardcover. It was a spin-off of National Lampoon magazine. It consisted of parodies of best-sellers. The book was edited by Jeff Greenfield, contributors included Gerry Sussman, Danny Abelson, Sean Kelly and Ellis Weiner.
