= Buy This Box or We'll Shoot This Dog =

Buy This Box or We'll Shoot This Dog: The Best of the National Lampoon Radio Hour

Compilation album by National Lampoon
- Released: 1996
- Genres: Comedy, Parody

National Lampoon chronology
National Lampoon Sex, Drugs, Rock 'N' Roll & the End of the World	Buy This Box or We'll Shoot This Dog: The Best of the National Lampoon Radio Hour

Professional ratings
Review scores
Source	Rating
AllMusic	4.5/5 stars

Buy This Box or We'll Shoot This Dog: The Best of the National Lampoon Radio Hour is a CD box set of recordings from the National Lampoon Radio Hour, which was a spin-off from National Lampoon magazine. It was released on March 26, 1996.

Performers from the Radio Hour include: John Belushi, Chevy Chase, Christopher Guest, Richard Belzer, Gilda Radner, Brian Doyle-Murray, Bill Murray, Joe Flaherty, Harold Ramis, and Michael O'Donoghue. The tracks include parodies of Marlon Brando, Charles Bronson, Joni Mitchell, Clint Eastwood, Gregory Peck, and James Taylor.

The title and the cover illustration are taken from the award-winning cover of the January 1973 "Death" issue of National Lampoon magazine with the line, "If You Don't Buy This Magazine, We'll Kill This Dog".
