= National Lampoon Presents French Comics =

American humor book

National Lampoon Presents French Comics (The Kind Men Like)
- Author: Peter Kaminsky (editor)
- Language: English
- Genre: humor
- Publisher: National Lampoon
- Publication date: 1977
- Publication place: United States
- Media type: Print
- ISBN: 978-0-930368-76-0

National Lampoon Presents French Comics (The Kind Men Like) is an American humor book first published in 1977 in hardcover. It was a spin-off of National Lampoon magazine. The book is a collection of translated comics by French comic book artists and cartoonists of the 1970s, including Gérard Lauzier, Moebius (Jean Giraud), Guido Buzzelli, Nikita Mandryka, Sole, Lozo, Jean-Claude Forest, Alexis, and Gotlib. The words were translated by Sophie Balcoff, Valerie Marchant, and Sean Kelly. Peter Kaminsky was the editor.
