= National Lampoon Art Poster Book =

- Cover artist: Mara McAfee
- Language: English
- Genre: comedy, parody
- Publisher: Harmony Books
- Publication date: 1975
- Publication place: United States
- Media type: Print

National Lampoon Art Poster Book was an American humor book that was published in large format softcover in 1975 by Harmony Books. The art posters of the title were pieces of artwork that had been featured in National Lampoon magazine.

A few of the posters were fine art parodies, including the cover art for the book, which was a cover by Mara McAfee that was a Van Gogh parody. The back cover was a Norman Rockwell parody. Numerous one-page illustrations were also included.
