= National Lampoon Comics =

Comics anthology

- Language: English
- Genre: comedy, parody
- Publisher: National Lampoon
- Publication date: 1974
- Publication place: United States
- Media type: Print

National Lampoon Comics was an American book, an anthology of comics; it was published in 1974 in paperback. The book was art directed by Michael C. Gross and David Kaestle.

Although it is to all appearances a book, the publication was apparently considered to be a special edition of National Lampoon magazine. (The book is described on the first page as being "Vol I, No. 7 in a series of special editions published three times a year".)

The anthology contained material that had been published in the magazine from 1970 to 1974. There is a 13-page Mad magazine parody, various photo funnies (fumetti) and many comics from the "Funny Pages" section of the magazine, including pieces by Charles Rodrigues, Vaughn Bodé, Shary Flenniken, Jeff Jones, Gahan Wilson, M. K. Brown, Randall Enos, Bobby London, Ed Subitzky, Stan Mack and Joe Orlando.
