= Raymond Kursar =

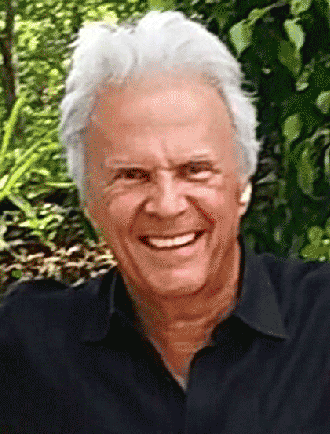
- Kursar in 2020

Raymond Kursar (born 1944) is an American artist, illustrator and graphic designer; known for his Broadway play posters, fine giclee limited edition prints and the movie classic Gone with the Wind collector's plate collection.

== Early art training ==
Kursar art career training began in 1966. He attended the School of Advertising Arts in Portland, Oregon. This exposure afforded him an artistic position in the advertising department of Lipman & Wolf Company. After honing his illustration skills at Lipman & Wolf Company by 1969 he saved enough money to relocate to New York City. There Kursar was hired by a Madison Avenue advertising agency from 1969 to 1972 where he created product and label packaging designs. In 1973 to 1979 Kursar began illustrating for several publishing houses and greeting card manufactures. He created greeting cards for the American Artist's Group as many contemporary artists like Chen Chi, Eyvind Earle, Norman Rockwell, Ralph Avery, Hans Moller, who also created seasonal greeting card designs year after year for the American Artist's Group.

== Illustrations ==
From 1979 to 1985 Kursar illustrated a number of today's popular American magazines, and his illustrations appeared in Ladies Home Journal, Good Housekeeping, Reader's Digest and National Lampoon. He has also illustrated hundreds of romance novel covers for book publishers such as Bantam Books, Ace Books, Random House and Pocket Books & Zebra Books, Avon, Fawcett, Ballantine, Doubleday, Charles Scribner & Sons, etc. In 1979 Kursar was commissioned by the Knowles China Plate Company to illustrate on fine china the movie classic Gone with the Wind. This collectable plate collection was featured as the cover story in the June 1983 issue of Plate World Magazine.

== Posters and fine art prints ==
Kursar illustrated posters for Shakespeare in the Park and created poster art for numerous events and Broadway plays including Grease, Hello Dolly, City Of Angles, The Good Doctor, That Championship Season, and Legend. Kursar was also commissioned to do artwork for album covers for the works of classical guitarist Andrés Segovia and jazz musician Louis Armstrong. Kursar has also created art pieces & posters for producer Joseph Papp, writer Neil Simon and magician Harry Blackstone. Kursar also prepared poster art for Big Apple Circus and the Ringling Brothers Barnum & Bailey Circus. Currently Kursar fine art prints are presented on Artmajeur a leading online art gallery that features a collection of contemporary artists. Artmajeur also provides tools for artists and gallery managers to promote and sell artwork including paintings, sculptures, photography and fine art prints.
