= Would You Buy a Used War from This Man? =

Would You Buy A Used War From This Man? A Collection of Political Humor From National Lampoon
- Editor: Henry Beard
- Cover artist: Ed Sorel
- Language: English
- Genre: Parody
- Publisher: Warner Paperback Library
- Publication date: 1972
- Publication place: United States
- Media type: Print (paperback)
- ISBN: 978-0446657983

Would You Buy A Used War From This Man? A Collection of Political Humor From National Lampoon is a 1972 American humor book, a paperback anthology of pieces of political humor from National Lampoon magazine.

The "This Man" in the title was Richard Nixon, who was the President of the United States from 1969 to 1974, and the "War" in the title was the Vietnam War, which lasted from 1955 to 1975. The title referred to a poster in the 1960 presidential campaign that showed a grinning Nixon with the caption "Would YOU buy a used car from this man?"

The cartoonist Ed Sorel drew the cover illustration, which shows Nixon as a used car salesman leaning on a pile of blood-stained army uniforms, with a sign in the background with lettering that says "TRICKY DICKY" and "USED CARNAGE". The book was published by Warner-Paperback Library.
