= Multiplicity (film) =

1996 film by Harold Ramis

- Theatrical release poster
- Directed by: Harold Ramis
- Screenplay by: Chris Miller; Mary Hale; Lowell Ganz; Babaloo Mandel
- Based on: "Multiplicity" by Chris Miller
- Produced by: Trevor Albert; Harold Ramis
- Starring: Michael Keaton; Andie MacDowell; Harris Yulin; Richard Masur
- Cinematography: László Kovács
- Edited by: Craig Herring Pembroke J. Herring
- Music by: George Fenton
- Production company: Columbia Pictures
- Distributed by: Sony Pictures Releasing
- Release date: July 17, 1996
- Running time: 117 minutes
- Language: English
- Budget: $45 million
- Box office: $37 million

Multiplicity is a 1996 American science fiction comedy film starring Michael Keaton and Andie MacDowell about a man able to duplicate himself by machine, each duplicate developing a different personality, causing problems. It was based on Chris Miller's short story of the same name, published in National Lampoon magazine. The film was co-produced and directed by Harold Ramis. The original music score was composed by George Fenton.

The film was released by Sony Pictures Releasing on July 17, 1996. It received mixed reviews from critics, and grossed a worldwide total of $37 million at the box office, significantly less than its $45 million budget.

== Plot ==
Doug Kinney works in construction in Los Angeles, and his job constantly gets in the way of his family. Working on a new wing of a scientific facility, Doug meets Dr. Leeds, a scientist who developed a method for cloning humans. He is introduced to Dr. Leeds' clone as proof. Sympathetic to Doug's troubles, Dr. Leeds clones him, so the clone can take over for Doug at work, while the original tries to spend time with his family. "Two", a clone who calls himself "Lance", has all of Doug's memories and knowledge, but is also an exaggeration of Doug's masculine side.

Doug tries to keep his clone a secret. While he and his wife Laura are at a restaurant for dinner, he sees Two on his own date. Doug begins to worry about his clone being revealed.

Despite the complications of having a clone, Lance is extremely busy at work, so Doug has another made to help out at home. "Three", who calls himself "Rico", is an exaggeration of Doug's feminine side. He is sensitive and thoughtful and loves to cook and take care of the house, much to Lance's chagrin.

Lance and Rico attempt to make another clone, "Four", who is later named Lenny. Since he is a clone-of-a-clone (and a copy of a copy may not be as 'sharp' as the original), his intelligence is lower than that of his predecessors, yet Lenny represents an exaggeration of Doug's immature side, and he refers to Doug as "Steve". Annoyed, Doug decrees that no more clones be created.

Doug decides to take some time off, going on a sailing trip. He does not want Laura to know, so he has his clones step in for him while he is away. Although he instructs them that Laura is off limits, while he is gone each of the clones run into Laura. Despite their best efforts to follow instructions, she persists and eventually has sex with all three of them, thinking they are Doug.

The next day, Lance has a cold and cannot go to work, so he sends Rico. During an inspection on site, Rico's ignorance about the current construction site annoys the inspector, which leads to Doug losing his job.

Laura becomes increasingly upset with her husband's erratic behavior and how he has no memories of discussions she unwittingly had with another clone. Thinking Doug is ignoring her, she reveals her feelings to Lenny, mentioning how Doug has never kept his promise to fix up the house. When she asks him what he wants, an inattentive Lenny replies, "I want pizza". Upset, she takes the children and moves back to her parents' home.

After finding out everything that has happened while he was away, Doug tries to determine how to get Laura back. Lenny tells him that Laura said he never fixed the house. With the help of the clones, Doug remodels their home and wins back Laura's love. He also tells her he is planning to start his own contracting business. Realizing Doug can take care of himself now, the clones move away. As they are driving away, Laura sees them in the car next to her. Believing that she is hallucinating, Laura tells her children that you can tell you really love someone when everyone you see reminds you of them.

The clones write to Doug that they have set up a successful pizzeria called "Three Guys from Nowhere" in Miami, Florida, and masquerade as triplets. Lance becomes the businessman of the shop and serves customers, enjoying this opportunity to meet women. Rico is the head chef and is "cooking up a storm and having a ball", and Lenny is both the delivery boy and a paperboy. But because of his limited intellect, he confuses the two jobs, and the movie ends with him delivering a pizza by throwing it, newspaper-style.

== Cast ==
- Michael Keaton as:
  - Doug Kinney
  - Lance (Two), Rico & Lenny's identical triplet brother and Doug's first clone.
  - Rico (Three), Lance & Lenny's identical triplet brother and Doug's second clone.
  - Lenny (Four), Lance & Rico's identical triplet brother and Doug's clone made from Two.
- Andie MacDowell as Laura Kinney, Doug's wife
- Harris Yulin as Dr. Leeds
- Richard Masur as Del King
- Eugene Levy as Vic
- Obba Babatundé as Paul
- Ann Cusack as Noreen
- John de Lancie as Ted Gray
- Brian Doyle-Murray as Walt
- Julie Bowen as Robin
- Zack Duhame as Zack Kinney, Doug & Laura's son
- Katie Schlossberg as Jennifer Kinney, Doug & Laura's daughter
- Judith Kahan as Franny
- Dawn Maxey as Beth
- Kari Coleman as Patti
- Glenn Shadix as a building inspector

== Production ==
In January 1993, it was reported Columbia Pictures was in the process of acquiring Multiplicity, a script from husband and wife writing team Chris Miller and Mary Hale and based on a short story by Miller published in National Lampoon. Harold Ramis tried to convince Tom Hanks to star in the film.

== Reception ==
=== Box office ===
The film was released July 17 and ranked seventh at the US box office that weekend. The film was not a success at the box office, grossing a total of $21,075,014 in the US and Canada, less than half of its $45 million budget, and $36.9 million worldwide. The Olympic Games was blamed for the poor opening weekend, and Independence Day held on to the number one position. John Krier, head of Exhibitor Relations, disagreed that the Olympics were to blame, instead saying competition from other films were the cause since total grosses were the same as the previous year. Multiplicity was competing for the same audience as Eddie Murphy's The Nutty Professor.

=== Critical response ===
Multiplicity received mixed reviews from critics. On Rotten Tomatoes, it has an approval rating of 46% based on 48 reviews, with an average rating of 5.4/10. The site's critical consensus reads: "This high-concept experiment only proves that a comedy actually can have too much Michael Keaton." Metacritic, which uses a weighted average, assigned the film a score of 53 out of 100, based on 25 critics, indicating "mixed or average" reviews. Audiences surveyed by CinemaScore gave the film a grade B on scale of A to F.

Roger Ebert of the Chicago Sun-Times gave the film 2.5 out of 4, and wrote: "Groundhog Day had a certain sweetness and even a sly philosophical depth, but Multiplicity is more of a ground-level comedy, in which we can usually anticipate the problems for Doug and his clones." Janet Maslin of The New York Times gave the film a mixed review, writing that it created "such an uninteresting plot around its bland, generic principals that it rarely reaches the absurdist heights its premise demands."

=== Home media ===
The film was released to DVD on April 15, 1998.

Multiplicity was released in widescreen on DVD by Umbrella Entertainment in May 2012. The DVD is compatible with region code 4, and includes special features such as the theatrical trailer and crew biographies.

== See also ==
- Living with Yourself, a 2019 TV series dealing with similar consequences, although this time their basis was unintentional.
