= National Lampoon The Up Yourself Book =

The Up Yourself Book
- Language: English
- Genre: humor, parody
- Publisher: National Lampoon
- Publication date: 1977
- Publication place: United States
- Media type: Print
- Pages: 143

National Lampoon The Up Yourself Book was an American humor book that was published on January 1, 1977. Although it appears to be a book, this was a "special edition" of National Lampoon magazine, and as such it was sold in newsstands along with the regular monthly issue of the magazine. It is a parody of self-help books.

The book was conceived and edited by Gerald Sussman, although the cover claims the book was written by "PETER AND PEGGY POPE, PH Ds" and gives it the subtitle "SEARCHING FOR THE WAY TO BE A BETTER YOU UNTIL YOU DIE". The cover was drawn in a naive style and shows a couple driving a red Mercedes down a road towards a setting sun which is a visual pun referring to self-absorption.
