= Sex, Drugs, Rock 'N' Roll & the End of the World =

Studio album by National Lampoon
- Released: 1982
- Genre: Comedy, Parody

National Lampoon chronology
Official National Lampoon Car Stereo Test and Demonstration Tape	Sex, Drugs, Rock 'N' Roll & the End of the World	Buy This Box or We'll Shoot This Dog

Sex, Drugs, Rock 'N' Roll & the End of the World is an American comedy album first released in 1982 by National Lampoon magazine. It was later released as a CD.

Performers included Rodger Bumpass, Suzy Demeter, Barry Diamond, Teresa Ganzel, Wendy Goldman, Mike Griffin, Fred Jones, Elizabeth Kemp, Tony Kisch, Jeff Madell, Phil Proctor, Tony Scheuren, and Michael Simmons.

== Tracks ==
1. An Introduction
2. Annie
3. Firing LIne
4. Cocaine
5. Jane Fonda Speaks Out
6. Firing Line 2
7. Sushi Riot
8. Godspeak Suite: Porkbucket Place
9. Godspeak Suite: Born Again Bob
10. Godspeak Suite: Godspeak
11. Godspeak Suite: My Bod Is For God
12. South Bronx is Burning
13. Byz Talk
14. Abe Schenckle's Rock Show
15. Sidewinders
16. Byz Talk 2
17. A Walk in the Park
18. Best Friends
19. Mr. Reagan's Neighborhood
20. Apocalypso Now!
