= Anne Beatts =

American writer (1947–2021)

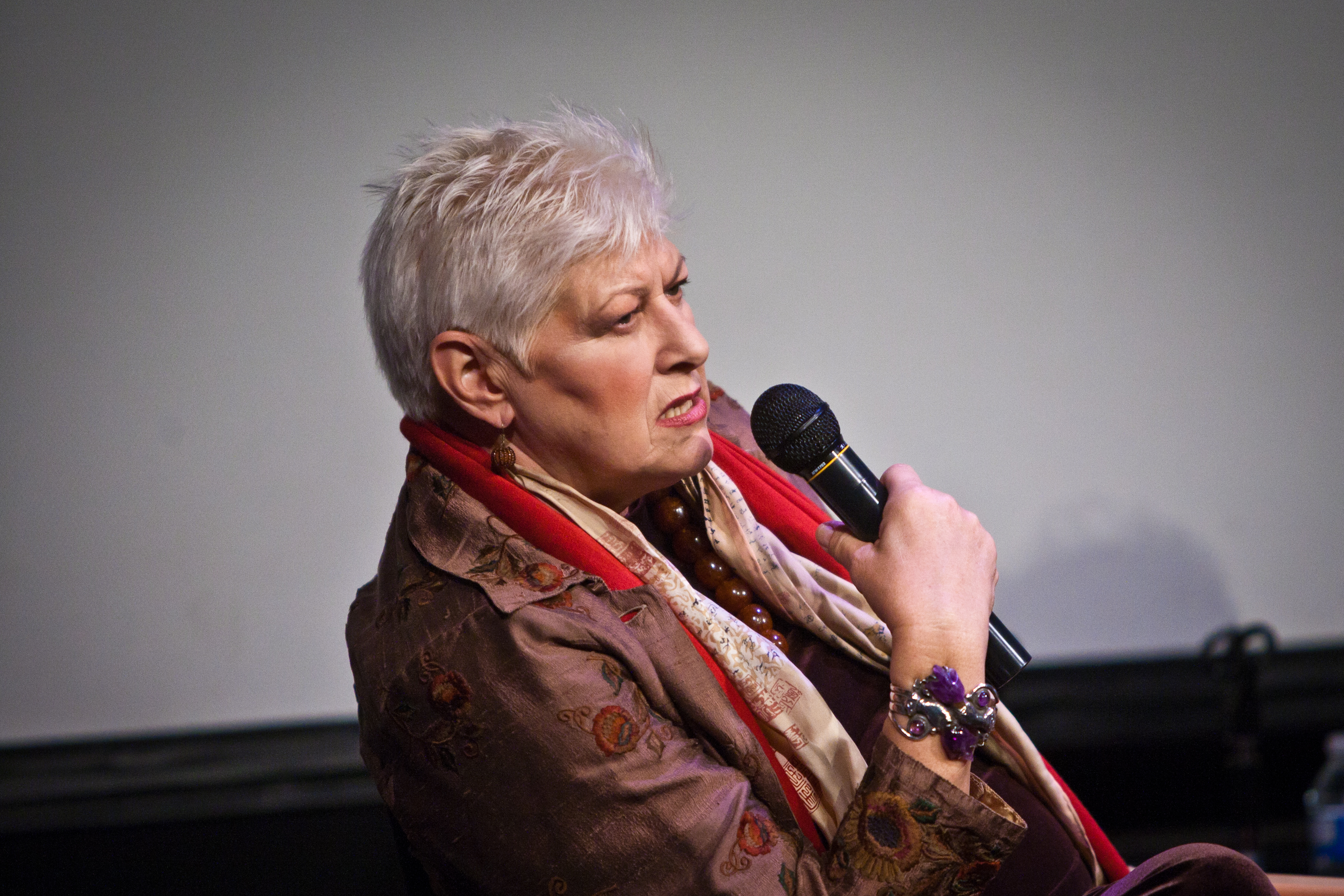
- Beatts in 2010
- Born: February 25, 1947; Buffalo, New York, U.S.
- Died: April 7, 2021 (aged 74); West Hollywood, California, U.S.
- Education: McGill University
- Occupations: Screenwriter, comedy writer
- Notable work: National Lampoon; Saturday Night Live; Square Pegs

Anne Beatts (February 25, 1947 – April 7, 2021) was an American screenwriter and comedy writer.

== Early life ==
Beatts was born in Buffalo, New York, to Sheila Elizabeth Jean (Sherriff-Scott) and Patrick Murray Threipland Beatts. She has described her parents as "beatniks." Beatts had what has been called an "aggressive, dark sensibility." Growing up in Somers, New York, she later attended McGill University.

It was at McGill University where Beatts discovered the dark humor of Jewish writers J. D. Salinger, Philip Roth, and Bruce Jay Friedman. At this time, Beatts converted to Judaism.

== National Lampoon ==
After graduating from college, Beatts wrote for The Village Voice and National Lampoon magazine, a national offshoot of the Harvard Lampoon. She co-wrote a parody advertisement for Volkswagen, conceived by Philip Socci, for which the magazine was later sued by the car company. The advertisement stated, "If Ted Kennedy drove a Volkswagen, he'd be President today," accompanied by a photograph of a VW Beetle floating on a lake (an allusion to Kennedy's Chappaquiddick incident).

During Beatts' time at National Lampoon magazine, she worked with Michael O'Donoghue. The two became romantically involved, and both joined the creative team of Saturday Night Live in the early years of the program.

== Television ==
At SNL, she was nominated for an Emmy five times, winning once. Beatts created the 1982 CBS sitcom Square Pegs starring Sarah Jessica Parker and Jami Gertz, and additionally appeared in uncredited guest spots on the early SNL. For Square Pegs, Beatts hired a staff of five women writers, believing they would be best able to voice the experiences of a teenage girl, but the network compelled her to include a male writer, Andy Borowitz, to connect with a broader audience.

Beatts wrote the book for the 1985 Ellie Greenwich jukebox musical Leader of the Pack.

Starting in 1987, she produced the first season of The Cosby Show spinoff A Different World.

In 2000 she won a Writers Guild Award for Best Comedy/Variety show for her part in writing the Saturday Night Live: 25th Anniversary Special.

In 2006, she directed the series John Waters Presents Movies That Will Corrupt You with her writing and producing partner, Eve Brandstein, for B-Girls Productions.

In 2007, Beatts served as one of the judges for the online comedy competition Project Breakout.

Beatts served as Adjunct Professor in the Writing Division at the University of Southern California's School of Cinematic Arts, as well as at Chapman University's Dodge College of Film and Media Arts. She also gave private lessons on writing sketch comedy.

== Media portrayals ==
Beatts was portrayed by Natasha Lyonne in the 2018 Netflix film A Futile and Stupid Gesture, and Leander Suleiman in Saturday Night. She was profiled in the January 6, 2020, issue of New York Magazine.

== Death ==
Beatts died at age 74 on April 7, 2021, at her home in West Hollywood.

== Works ==
- National Lampoon (Magazine)
- National Lampoon's Lemmings (with Sean Kelly, Tony Hendra, Christopher Guest, and Paul Jacobs) (1973) (Stage Show)
- Tarzoon: Shame of the Jungle (with Michael O'Donoghue) (1975) (Adaptation)
- National Lampoon: A Dirty Book (1976) (Book)
- Saturday Night Live (1975–1980) (TV)
- Titters: The First Collection of Humor by Women (with Deanne Stillman) (1976) (Book)
- Gilda Live (with Gilda Radner, Michael O'Donoghue, Alan Zweibel, Don Novello, Lorne Michaels, Marilyn Suzanne Miller, Paul Shaffer, and Rosie Shuster) (1980) (Stage Show)
- Square Pegs (1982–1983) (TV)
- Titters 101 (with Deanne Stillman and Judith Jacklin Belushi) (1984) (Book)
- Leader of the Pack (1985) (Stage Show)
- The Mom Book (with Judith Jacklin Belushi and Deanne Stillman) (1986) (Book)
- A Different World (1987–1988) (TV) (Producer only)
- Faerie Tale Theatre (1987) (TV)
- The Belles of Bleeker Street (1991) (TV)
- Murphy Brown (1991) (TV)
- The Elvira Show (1993) (TV)
- The Stephanie Miller Show (1995) (TV)
- Happily Ever After: Fairy Tales for Every Child (2000) (TV)
- Hollywood Off-Ramp (2000) (TV)
- 56th Annual Writers' Guild Awards (2004) (TV)
