= Official National Lampoon Bicentennial Calendar 1976 =

Bicentennial Calendar 1976

Official National Lampoon Bicentennial Calendar 1976 was an American humorous calendar that was published in 1975 as a spin-off from National Lampoon magazine. It was written and compiled by Christopher Cerf and Bill Effros. The cover art is a drawing of Mount Rushmore showing a bullet hole in the forehead of the sculpture of US President Abraham Lincoln (a reference to his assassination in 1865).
