= Robert Hoffman (businessman) =

American businessman and philanthropist (1947-2006)

Robert Kenneth Hoffman (July 18, 1947 – August 20, 2006) was an American businessman and philanthropist, most notable for co-founding the influential humor magazine National Lampoon.

== Life and career ==
Hoffman was born in Oklahoma City, Oklahoma, the son of Adelyn J. and Edmund M. Hoffman. He graduated valedictorian from the St. Mark's School of Texas in 1965. While a senior at Harvard, he was one of the three editors of The Harvard Lampoon who went on to co-found the National Lampoon in 1970. He served as its first managing editor. In 1975 he sold his share and used the proceeds to buy a Helen Frankenthaler painting.

Hoffman left the National Lampoon to attend the Harvard Business School as a Baker Scholar, graduating in 1972. After graduation, he joined his father, Edmund, in the company that became the Coca-Cola Bottling Group (Southwest) Inc. The two helped build it into the country's fifth-largest Coca-Cola bottler before selling it in 1998.

Hoffman chaired the Dallas Plan, a 30-year blueprint for reshaping the city of Dallas, which had been unanimously adopted by the City Council in December 1994. He also served as board chairman of the Dallas Arboretum and Botanical Society for a critical five years beginning in 1987.

Hoffman and his wife, Marguerite, a former gallery director, amassed a world-renowned art collection that they donated in nearly its entirety to the Dallas Museum of Art in 2005. The 224 pieces were valued at a minimum of $150 million. That gift, coupled with the Hoffmans' role in spearheading additional bequests of 550 objects from friends Cindy and Howard Rachofsky and Deedie and Rusty Rose, put them on Business Week magazine's list of the top 50 philanthropists for 2005. Hoffman and his wife were awarded the 2006 TACA Neiman Marcus Silver Cup Award for their civic contributions, the first time that a couple won the award.

== Family and death ==
Hoffman had three daughters: Hannah and Augusta, whose mother is Hoffman's first wife, Sally Timberlake Hoffman; and Kate. All three attended The Hockaday School. He had one brother, Richard E. Hoffman, MD, who survived him and lives in Denver, Colorado.

Hoffman died of leukemia in Dallas at age 59. Because of his influential efforts at the St. Mark's School of Texas, a large donation was given in his name in order to build a new building.

== See also ==
- Notable alumni of St. Mark's School of Texas
