= National Lampoon's Class of '86 =

- Poster for VHS recording
- Book: Andy Simmons and Dave Hanson
- Productions: 1986 at the Village Gate

National Lampoon's Class of '86 was a musical comedy stage show, performed at the Village Gate in New York City's Greenwich Village in 1986. It was a spin-off of National Lampoon magazine. A recording of the show was broadcast as part of Showtime Comedy Spotlight on cable television in the 1980s (first on December 6, 1986), and it was subsequently available on VHS videocassette. The show's length was about two hours.

== Production ==
The show was a sketch-based satire of 1980s culture. In terms of plot, the sketches are held together by a frame story of two hippies named Galahad and Dewdrop, who had taken LSD in 1969, fallen into a deep sleep, and then woken up 17 years later in 1986. The sketches in the show lampooned yuppie culture, health food, the Reagan Administration, airplane hijackings and psychotherapy.

The writers were Andy Simmons and Dave Hanson. Sketches include "The Cabinet Meeting" and "Tasty Fresh". Songs include "Please Don't Drop The Bomb On My Boyfriend" and "Yuppie Love," written by Richard Levinson. The show was directed by Jerry Adler, and the six cast members were Rodger Bumpass, Veanne Cox, Annie Golden, Tommy Koenig, Brian O'Connor and John Michael Higgins.

Several sketches and songs from the show were left off the Showtime special and the VHS recording version. These included "Solid God," a cross between Solid Gold and The 700 Club which featured a born again comic and Golden as Madonna, singing "My Bod Is For God (only sex with Jesus from now on)."

The onstage band consisted of Michael Sansonia (keyboards), Paul Guzzone (bass), Robert Bond (drums), and Stu Ziff (guitar). Sansonia (the musical director) also wrote several songs for the show, including "A President's Dream."
