= Professor Pepper's School of Good Stuff =

- Written by: Amy Tam
- Directed by: Amy Tam
- Starring: Amy Tam; C.K. Thurber
- Country of origin: United States
- Original language: English

Production
- Producer: Norman Lieder

Original release
- Release: March 13, 2006

Professor Pepper's School of Good Stuff is a 2006 American animated comedy television film written and directed by Amy Tam. It was edited by C.K. Thurber, and distributed by National Lampoon, Inc. The name of the movie is taken from the name of The Beatles' album Sgt. Pepper's Lonely Hearts Club Band.

== Cast ==
- Amy Tam - Additional Voices
- C.K. Thurber - Dionea
