= Caddyshack =

1980 American sports comedy film by Harold Ramis

- Theatrical release poster
- Directed by: Harold Ramis
- Written by: Brian Doyle-Murray; Harold Ramis; Douglas Kenney
- Produced by: Douglas Kenney
- Starring: Chevy Chase; Rodney Dangerfield; Ted Knight; Michael O'Keefe; Bill Murray
- Cinematography: Stevan Larner
- Edited by: William C. Carruth
- Music by: Johnny Mandel
- Distributed by: Orion Pictures (through Warner Bros.)
- Release date: July 25, 1980
- Running time: 98 minutes
- Country: United States
- Language: English
- Budget: $4.8–6 million
- Box office: $60 million

Caddyshack is a 1980 American sports comedy film directed by Harold Ramis, written by Brian Doyle-Murray, Ramis and Douglas Kenney, and starring Chevy Chase, Rodney Dangerfield, Ted Knight, Michael O'Keefe and Bill Murray with supporting roles by Sarah Holcomb, Cindy Morgan, and Doyle-Murray. It tells the story of a caddie, vying for a caddie scholarship, who becomes involved in a feud on the links between one of the country club's founders and a nouveau riche guest. A subplot involves a greenskeeper who uses extreme methods against an elusive gopher.

Caddyshack was the directorial debut of Ramis and the film boosted the career of Dangerfield, who was then known primarily as a stand-up comedian. The film was released by Orion Pictures (through Warner Bros.) on July 25, 1980. Grossing nearly $40 million at the domestic box office (the 17th-highest of the year), it was the first of a series of similar "slob vs. snob" comedies.

The film received mixed reviews from critics upon its release, but it has since garnered a cult following and was described by ESPN as "perhaps the funniest sports movie ever made." A sequel titled Caddyshack II (1988) followed, although only Chase reprised his role; it was panned by critics and a box-office bomb.

== Plot ==
Teenager Danny Noonan is uncertain about his future, unsure whether to attend college but worried about becoming trapped in a menial job with few prospects. He works as a caddie at the exclusive Bushwood Country Club, serving its affluent clientele. Although he usually caddies for Ty Webb, a talented golfer and the easygoing playboy son of one of the club's co-founders, Danny volunteers to caddie for the haughty Judge Elihu Smails, Bushwood's other co-founder and the director of its caddie scholarship programme. Meanwhile, mentally unstable greenskeeper Carl Spackler is tasked with killing a destructive gopher driven onto the course by construction on an adjacent property development owned by Al Czervik.

The loud-mouthed and unconventional nouveau riche Czervik visits the club as a guest, but his behaviour quickly earns Smails' ire. Following one encounter, Smails angrily throws his putter and injures an elderly guest. Danny accepts the blame in an effort to gain Smails' favour. At Bushwood's annual Fourth of July banquet, Danny and his girlfriend, Maggie, work as waitstaff. Danny becomes attracted to Smails' promiscuous niece, Lacey Underall, who is visiting for the summer, while she and Webb begin a brief affair.

Danny later wins the Caddie Day golf tournament, earning an invitation from Smails to attend the christening of his boat at the nearby Rolling Lakes Yacht Club. Czervik disrupts the ceremony with his large yacht, and inadvertently destroys Smails' yacht, earning Smails ire. Afterwards, Lacey seduces Danny, and the pair have sex. Smails returns home and catches them, angrily chasing Danny from the house. Expecting to be fired, Danny is surprised when Smails instead demands that he keep the encounter secret to avoid public scandal, in exchange for receiving the scholarship.

Unable to tolerate Czervik's presence any longer, Smails declares that he will never be granted membership. Czervik replies that he is only interested in buying the club. After exchanging insults, Czervik proposes a team golf match, pitting himself and Webb against Smails and his regular partner, Dr Beeper. Although Webb normally avoids responsibility and pressure, he agrees to participate because of his dislike of Smails. In violation of club rules, the men wager $20,000 on the match, which is soon doubled to $40,000.

During the match the following day, Danny caddies for Smails but becomes frustrated by his persistent cheating. News of the wager spreads, drawing a crowd of club members and employees. Smails and Beeper take the lead while Czervik and Webb struggle. Provoked by Smails' heckling, Czervik impulsively doubles the wager to $80,000. When his own ricocheting ball strikes him in the arm, Czervik feigns an injury in the hope of having the match declared a draw, only to learn that his team will forfeit unless it finds a substitute. Webb selects a reluctant Danny, and Smails threatens to revoke his scholarship. After Czervik promises to compensate him, Danny agrees to take Czervik's place.

At the final hole, the score is tied. Smails scores a birdie, requiring Danny to sink a difficult putt to draw level. Czervik raises the stakes by proposing double or nothing on Danny making the shot, which Smails reluctantly accepts. Danny's putt leaves the ball balanced on the edge of the hole, seemingly costing his team the match. At that moment, Carl detonates plastic explosives he has planted around the course in his latest attempt to kill the gopher. The resulting tremors cause the ball to fall into the hole, securing victory for Danny, Webb, and Czervik.

As the crowd celebrates, Czervik sends his associates after a fleeing Smails to ensure he pays his share of the wager. Meanwhile, Carl slips away after seeing the destruction caused by his explosives. Elsewhere on the course, the gopher emerges from underground largely unharmed and dances to Kenny Loggins' "I'm Alright".

== Cast ==
- Chevy Chase as Ty Webb, the wealthy son of one of Bushwood Country Club's founders and owner of several lumberyards.
- Rodney Dangerfield as Al Czervik, a nouveau riche golfer and successful businessman/real estate developer.
- Ted Knight as Elihu Smails, a judge who is one of the founders of Bushwood Country Club and director of the caddie scholarship program.
- Michael O'Keefe as Danny Noonan, a teenager who works as a caddie at Bushwood.
- Bill Murray as Carl Spackler, an eccentric greenskeeper at Bushwood Country Club who is charged with the duty of ridding it of the gopher.
- Sarah Holcomb as Maggie O'Hooligan, Danny's girlfriend who works as a waitress at Bushwood.
- Cindy Morgan as Lacey Underall, Elihu Smails's oversexed niece.
- Scott Colomby as Tony D'Annunzio, Danny's co-worker and frenemy.
- Dan Resin as Dr. Beeper, Elihu Smails's regular golfing partner.
- Henry Wilcoxon as Fred Pickering, an Episcopalian bishop and golfing friend of Elihu Smails.
- Elaine Aiken as Julie Noonan, Danny's mother.
- Albert Salmi as Roy Noonan, Danny's father.
- Ann Ryerson as Grace, a caddie.
- Brian Doyle-Murray as Lou Loomis, the manager of Bushwood Country Club's caddie shack.
- Hamilton Mitchell as Motormouth
- Peter Berkrot as Angie D'Annunzio, Tony's brother who is Danny's co-worker.
- John F. Barmon Jr. as Spaulding Smails, Elihu Smails's grandson.
- Lois Kibbee as Mrs. Smails, Elihu Smails's wife.
- Minerva Scelza as Joey D'Annunzio, a young caddie at Bushwood Country Club.
- Brian McConnachie as Drew Scott, a friend of Al Czervik who is a member of the Bushwood Country Club.
- Scott Powell as Gatsby
- Jackie Davis as Smoke Porterhouse, a worker at Bushwood Country Club.
- Thomas A. Carlin as Sandy McFiddish, the Scottish greenskeeper at Bushwood Country Club who is Carl's direct boss.
- Kenneth Burritt as Mr. Havercamp
- Ron Frank as Pat Noonan, Danny's brother.
- Patricia Wilcox as Nancy Noonan, Danny's sister.
- Debi Frank as Kathleen Noonan, Danny's sister.
- Mel Pape as the Smails' family Butler
- Dennis McCormack as Dennis Noonan, Danny's younger cousin.
- Violet Ramis as a Noonan child
- Pat Brymer as the puppeteer of Mr. Gopher (uncredited)

== Production ==
The film was inspired by writer and co-star Brian Doyle-Murray's memories of working as a caddie at Indian Hill Club in Winnetka, Illinois. His brothers Bill and John Murray (production assistant and a caddie extra) and director Harold Ramis also had worked as caddies when they were teenagers. Many of the characters in the film were based on characters they had encountered through their various experiences at the club, including a young woman upon whom the character of Maggie is based and the Haverkamps, a doddering old couple, John and Ilma, longtime members of the club, who can barely hit the ball out of their shadows. The scene in which Al Czervik hits Judge Smails in the genitals with a struck golf ball happened to Ramis on what he said was the second of his two rounds of golf, on a nine-hole public course.

The film was shot over eleven weeks during the autumn of 1979; Hurricane David in early September delayed production. Golf scenes were filmed at the Rolling Hills Golf Club (now the Grande Oaks Golf Club) in Davie, Florida. According to Ramis, Rolling Hills was chosen because the course did not have any palm trees. He wanted the film to feel that it was in the Midwest, not Florida. The explosions that take place during the climax of the film were reported at the nearby Fort Lauderdale–Hollywood International Airport by an incoming pilot, who suspected that a plane had crashed. The Fourth of July dinner-and-dancing scene was filmed at the Boca Raton Hotel and Club in Boca Raton, Florida.

The scene that begins when Ty Webb's golf ball crashes into Carl Spackler's shack was not in the original script. It was added by director Harold Ramis after realizing that two of his biggest stars, Chevy Chase and Bill Murray, did not appear in a scene together. The three met for lunch and wrote the scene. While there were some worries about how Chase and Murray would act around one another, due to their rivalry while working together on Saturday Night Live, the two remained friendly and professional with one another throughout the whole writing and filming of the scene. This is the only film in which Chase and Murray have appeared together.

Murray improvised much of the "Cinderella story" scene based on two lines of stage direction. Ramis gave him direction to act as a child. Murray hit flowers with a grass whip while fantasizing aloud about winning the Masters Tournament, a major golf tournament. Murray was with the production only six days, and his lines were largely unscripted. Murray was working on Saturday Night Live at the time, and was not intended to have a large role but his part "mushroomed" and he was repeatedly recalled from New York to film additional scenes as production continued.

Cindy Morgan said that a massage scene with Chevy Chase was improvised, and her reaction to Chase dousing her back with the massage oil, where she exclaimed "You're crazy!" was genuine. A scene in which her character dove into the pool was acted by a professional diver. Before the diver took over, she was led to the diving board by the crew and carefully directed up the ladder since she could not wear her contact lenses near the pool and was legally blind without them.

A deal was made with John Dykstra's effects company for visual effects, including lightning, stormy sky effects, flying golf balls and disappearing greens' flags. The gopher was part of the effects package. Dykstra's technicians added hydraulic animation to the puppet, including ear movement, and built the tunnels through which it moved.

The production became infamous for the amount of drug usage which occurred on set, with supporting actor Peter Berkrot describing cocaine as "the fuel that kept the film running."

=== Locations ===
- Noonan house – 232 North Avenue 54, Los Angeles
- Bushwood gates – West Gate, Bel Air
- Bushwood Country Club – Rolling Hills Golf Club, Davie, Florida (now Grande Oaks Golf Club)
- Bushwood pool – Plantation Preserve Golf Course, Plantation, Florida
- Czervik Condominiums – Century Hill Condominiums, Los Angeles (from Galaxy Way)
- Rolling Lake Yacht Club – Rusty Pelican restaurant, Miami
- Smails house – 4531 NE 25th Street, Fort Lauderdale

== Reception ==
=== Box office ===
Caddyshack was released on July 25, 1980, in 656 theaters, and grossed $3.1 million during its opening weekend; it went on to make $39,846,344 in North America, and $60 million worldwide.

=== Critical response ===
The film was met with underwhelming reviews in its original 1980 release, with criticism towards the disorganized plot, though Dangerfield's, Chase's, and Murray's comic performances were generally well received.

Roger Ebert of The Chicago Sun-Times gave the film two-and-a-half stars out of four and said Dangerfield’s performance was the standout and Chase had some good scenes. However, the main flaw was its three lead actors (Dangerfield, Chase, and Murray) didn’t interact much and seemed to be occupying different films: "Caddyshack feels more like a movie that was written rather loosely, so that when shooting began there was freedom—too much freedom—for it to wander off in all directions in search of comic inspiration." For The Chicago Tribune, Gene Siskel gave Caddyshack three out of four stars, saying it was "funny about half of the time it tries to be, which is a pretty good average for a comedy."

Dave Kehr, in his review for the Chicago Reader, wrote, "The first-time director, Harold Ramis, can't hold it together: the picture lurches from style to style (including some ill-placed whimsy with a gopher puppet) and collapses somewhere between sitcom and sketch farce." Vincent Canby gave it a mixed review in The New York Times, describing it as "A pleasantly loose-limbed sort of movie with some comic moments, most of them belonging to Mr. Dangerfield."

Nevertheless, in the years following the film's release, Caddyshack has been positively reappraised by many critics and has come to be regarded as a cult classic. On review aggregator Rotten Tomatoes, the film holds an approval rating of 73% based on 62 reviews, with an average score of 6.60/10. The website's critical consensus reads, "Though unabashedly crude and juvenile, Caddyshack nevertheless scores with its classic slapstick, unforgettable characters, and endlessly quotable dialogue." On Metacritic, the film received a score of 48 based on 12 reviews, indicating "mixed or average" reviews.

Christopher Null gave the film four stars out of five in his 2005 review, and wrote, "They don't make 'em like this anymore … The plot wanders around the golf course and involves a half-dozen elements, but if you simply dig the gopher, the caddie, and the Dangerfield, you're not going to be doing half bad."

Ramis noted in the DVD documentary that TV Guide had originally given the film two stars (out of four) when it began showing on cable television in the early 1980s, but over time the rating had gone up to three stars. In 2009, he said, "I can barely watch it. All I see are a bunch of compromises and things that could have been better," such as the poor golf swings of everyone, except for O'Keefe.

Denmark was the only place outside the United States where Caddyshack was initially a hit. The distributor had cut 20 minutes to emphasize Bill Murray's role.

=== Accolades ===
This film is also second on Bravo's "100 Funniest Movies."

The film is recognized by American Film Institute in these lists:

- 2000: AFI's 100 Years...100 Laughs – #71
- 2005: AFI's 100 Years...100 Movie Quotes:
  - Carl Spackler: "Cinderella story. Outta nowhere. A former greenskeeper, now, about to become the Masters champion. It looks like a mirac... It's in the hole! It's in the hole! It's in the hole!" – #92
- 2008: AFI's 10 Top 10:
  - #7 Sports Film

== Soundtrack ==
In anticipation of the movie, the Kenny Loggins single "I'm Alright" was released nearly three weeks before the movie opened and became a top ten hit the last week of September 1980. CBS Records also issued a soundtrack to Caddyshack later that year. It included ten songs, four of which were performed by Kenny Loggins, including "I'm Alright."

== Sequel ==
There was a sequel called Caddyshack II (1988) which performed poorly at the box office and is considered one of the worst sequels of all time. Only Chevy Chase reprised his role.

== Books ==
In 2007, Taylor Trade Publishing released The Book of Caddyshack, an illustrated paperback retrospective of the movie, with cast and crew Q&A interviews. The book was written by Scott Martin.

In April 2018, Flatiron Books published Caddyshack: The Making of a Hollywood Cinderella Story by Chris Nashawaty, detailing the making of the film.

== Caddyshack restaurants ==
On June 7, 2001, Bill Murray, Brian Doyle-Murray and their brothers opened a golf themed restaurant inspired by the film at the World Golf Village, near St. Augustine, Florida. The main location operated there for 25 years, and closed in June of 2026. There were other locations, which have since closed, in Myrtle Beach and Rosemont, Illinois.

== Popular culture ==
Many of the film's quotes are part of popular culture, with many fans able to recite the movie line for line and merchandise is still licensed and sold by several companies as of 2024. FunkoPop produced several figures in 2019, as well as a set exclusive to Target.

Tiger Woods said that he liked the film, and played Spackler in an American Express commercial based on the film.

The University of Minnesota uses part of the film as a dance sport ritual for athletics, encouraging fans at collegiate sports games to "Do the Gopher" and imitate the dancing gopher, referenced because of mascot Goldy Gopher.

In 2016, Bret Baier in a Fox News interview asked the Dalai Lama whether he had seen the film, referencing a scene where the Dalai Lama is mentioned in comical story told by assistant groundkeeper Carl Spackler. The Dalai Lama responded he had not seen the movie, and while he had played badminton, he had never played golf.

A 2023 Super Bowl commercial for alcohol brand Michelob featured modern athletes recreating scenes from the film.
