= Lemmings (National Lampoon) =

Stage show

National Lampoon: Lemmings
- The poster for the 1973 show.
- Music: Christopher Guest; Paul Jacobs
- Lyrics: Sean Kelly
- Book: David Axlerod; John Belushi; Christopher Guest; Tony Hendra; Paul Jacobs; Sean Kelly; Chevy Chase; Gary Goodrow
- Productions: 1973 Off-Broadway

National Lampoon: Lemmings, a spinoff of the humor magazine National Lampoon, was a 1973 stage show that helped launch the performing careers of John Belushi, Christopher Guest, and Chevy Chase. The show was co-written and co-directed by a number of people, including Sean Kelly.

Lemmings opened at The Village Gate on January 25, 1973, and ran for 350 performances.

The songs from the show were subsequently issued as a record album. A video of one of the original performances, National Lampoon: Lemmings: Dead in Concert 1973, was eventually made available several decades later.

The show was revived in 2007–2008, and an attempted reboot was to be staged in March 2020.

== Plot ==
The first half of the show was sketch comedy; the second half was a mock rock festival, "Woodshuck: Three Days of Peace, Love and Death", a parody of "Woodstock: Three Days of Peace and Music." "Woodshuck" featured spoofs of Woodstock performers, including Joe Cocker and Joan Baez, as well as parodies of John Denver, Bob Dylan and James Taylor, plus songs performed by fictional groups (e.g., the "Motown Manifestoes" singing "Papa was a Running Dog Lackey of the Bourgeoisie").

=== Acts ===
Title	Act being parodied	Lampoonist	Description
Welcome to the Woodshuck Festival: Three Days of Peace, Love, and Death		John Belushi	Plus band introductions throughout
"Lemmings Lament"	Crosby, Stills, Nash & Young	Paul Jacobs as David Crosby	Freud, Marx, Engels, and Jung (also referred to in performance as Freud, Pavlov, Adler, and Jung), parodying the songs "Woodstock," "Long Time Gone", and others
"Positively Wall Street"	Bob Dylan	Christopher Guest	Parody of several of Dylan's styles, with the title taken from "Positively 4th Street"
"Pizza Man" by Goldie Oldie	1950s-style performers	Alice Playten	Parody of teenage tragedy songs
"Colorado"	John Denver	Chevy Chase	
"Pull the Triggers, Niggers"	Joan Baez	Mary Jenifer Mitchell (later replaced by Rhonda Coullet)	A parody of Baez's protest songs and of Dylan's song "George Jackson," in particular. Listed on the album cover as "Pull the Tregroes, Negroes"
"Lonely at the Bottom"	Joe Cocker	John Belushi	With Paul Jacobs as Leon Russell on piano
"Highway Toes"	James Taylor	Christopher Guest	Parody of Tylor's heroin abuse referencing Taylor's "Highway Song"
"Papa was a Running Dog Lackey of the Bourgeoisie"	The Temptations	Paul Jacobs	Parody of "Papa Was a Rollin' Stone", with most of its lines taken from The Communist Manifesto
"Nirvana Banana"	Donovan	Peter Elbling	Later addition to the show
"I Do for You"	Joni Mitchell	Alice Playten (later replaced by Rhonda Coullet)	
Farmer Yassir	Max Yasgur	Garry Goodrow	Parody of the owner of the land on which Woodstock was held, greeting the audience
Megadeath	Heavy metal groups	John Belushi and Paul Jacobs	Band ends their act by turning the amps so loud that the audience dies
"Jackie Christ, Superstar"		Belushi, et al.	Parody of Jesus Christ Superstar; Jesus as a stand-up comedian, with Belushi as King Herod
"Deteriorata"	Les Crane	Tony Hendra	Parody of Crane's recording of "Desiderata"
"Resounding Defeat Day"			Parody of America's first military defeat in the Vietnam War. "Put all your troubles in a nickel bag and smile, smile, smile."
	The Rolling Stones	Alice Playten as Mick Jagger	

== Cast ==
The cast included:

- John Belushi - bass guitar
- Chevy Chase - drums
- Garry Goodrow - sax
- Christopher Guest - guitar
- Paul Jacobs -guitar, piano
- Mary Jenifer Mitchell
- Alice Playten

Later cast replacements:

- Rhonda Coullet
- Nate Herman
- Bob Hoban
- Zal Yanovsky
- Tony Scheuren
- Peter Elbling
- Archie Hahn
- John Wall

== Production ==
=== Writers ===
The writers included:

- Christopher Guest – music, musical arrangements
- Paul Jacobs – music, musical arrangements, musical director
- John Belushi
- Sean Kelly
- Tony Hendra
- David Axlerod

== Reception ==
A Time magazine reviewer called Lemmings "an uproariously funny spoof of the rock scene and its counterculture folk heroes," writing that the show's second half was "a brilliantly sustained rock parody," and predicting that, "Lemmings will slay many many more with its high-voltage humor." Reviewers for The New York Times initially gave the play lukewarm reviews, but a subsequent Times mention of the show lauded its "gleeful... desanctifi[cation of the] hallowed touchstones of the rock counterculture." And in 2005, Jake Tapper of the Times called Lemmings National Lampoon's "most famous live performance," writing that, "the team devastatingly satirized Woodstock attendees and performers as mindless masses running off to engage in trendy generational suicide."

=== Awards ===
- Alice Playten – 1973 Obie Award for Distinguished Performance

== Revivals ==
In the fall of 2007, National Lampoon, Inc. revived National Lampoon's Lemmings for a nationwide theatrical tour. The show consisted of a multimedia presentation of live sketches written and performed by the cast, which were integrated with related comedy videos.

In 2008, National Lampoon's Lemmings went into production with ManiaTV! on a half-hour web-based sketch comedy show. Notable cast members included Adam Devine, Blake Anderson, Kyle Newacheck and Anders Holm of Comedy Central's Workaholics fame, Jillian Bell, and Mark Gagliardi from Comedy Central's Drunk History and The Thrilling Adventure Hour.

In 2020, the company rebooted Lemmings as "Lemmings: 21st Century", which was scheduled to debut in a two-night engagement at Joe's Pub in Manhattan in March 2020 (right at the outset of the COVID-19 pandemic). Instead of spoofing Woodstock, the new stage play "tackle[d] modern festival culture through Downfall, a parody mash-up of corporatized events like Coachella and Bonnaroo."

== Cast recording ==
National Lampoon's Lemmings

Live album by the cast of Lemmings
- Released: 1973
- Genre: Comedy, Parody, Rock, folk rock
- Label: Blue Thumb Records, MCA Records, Decca Broadway
- Producer: Tony Hendra

National Lampoon chronology
National Lampoon Radio Dinner (1972)	National Lampoon's Lemmings (1973)	The Missing White House Tapes (1974)

Professional ratings
Review scores
Source	Rating
AllMusic	link

A cast recording of the show was released in 1973, with album cover art by Melinda Bordelon.

=== Track listing ===
==== Side One ====
1. Stage Announcements
  Performed by John Belushi
2. "Lemmings Lament"
  Lead vocal by Paul Jacobs (as David Crosby); instruments and backup vocals by the cast; written by Paul Jacobs and Sean Kelly.
3. Stage Announcements
  Performed by John Belushi
4. "Positively Wall Street"
  Lead vocal by Christopher Guest (as Bob Dylan); instruments and backup vocals by the cast; written by Paul Jacobs, Christopher Guest, and Sean Kelly.
5. Weather Person
  Performed by Garry Goodrow
6. "Pizza Man"
  Lead vocal by Alice Playten (as Goldie Oldie); instruments and back-up vocals by the cast; written by Christopher Guest, Sean Kelly, and Tony Hendra
7. Stage Announcements
  Performed by John Belushi
8. "Colorado"
  Lead vocal by Chevy Chase; instruments and backup vocals by the cast; written by Christopher Guest, Sean Kelly, and Tony Hendra
9. Richie Havens
  Performed by Christopher Guest (as Richie Havens)
10. Crowd Rain Chant
  Performed by John Belushi

==== Side Two ====
1. Stage Announcements
  Performed by John Belushi
2. "Papa Was a Running Dog Lackey" of the Bourgeoisie
  Lead vocal by Paul Jacobs; instruments and backup vocals by the cast; written by Paul Jacobs and Tony Hendra
3. All-Star Dead Band
  Performed by John Belushi
4. Stage Announcements
  Performed by John Belushi
5. "Highway Toes"
  Lead vocal by Christopher Guest (as James Taylor); instruments and backup vocals by the cast; written by Christopher Guest and Sean Kelly
6. Hell's Angel
  Performed by Chevy Chase
7. Stage Announcements
  Performed by John Belushi
8. Farmer Yassir
  Performed by Garry Goodrow
9. "Lonely at the Bottom"
  Lead vocal by John Belushi (as Joe Cocker); instruments and backup vocals by the cast; written by Paul Jacobs and John Belushi
10. Megagroupie
  Performed by Alice Playten
11. "Megadeath"
  Lead vocal by John Belushi; instruments and backup vocals by the cast; written by Paul Jacobs and Sean Kelly

== See also ==
- List of National Lampoon films
