= Mara McAfee =

American actress and illustrator

- Mara McAfee in Kiss Me Deadly 1955
- Born: November 27, 1929; Los Angeles, California
- Died: January 13, 1984 (aged 54); Los Angeles, California
- Known for: Painting, Illustration
- Movement: Pop Art

Mara McAfee (November 27, 1929 – January 13, 1984) was an American Pop artist and illustrator best known for her satirical depictions of historical figures, contemporary subjects, and high art traditions. During the 1950s McAfee was also an actress and a dancer who appeared in a number of popular films and television shows.

== Biography ==
McAfee attended Chouinard Art Institute (now CalArts) in Los Angeles and the Art Students League in New York City. She credited Frank Mason at the Art Students League for her classical art technique, saying: "It was no easy task to find a teacher who even knew how the great artists of the past painted." She went on to spend two years copying the masters at the Metropolitan Museum of Art in New York. "Learning to work in almost any style was the basis for my success as an illustrator."

While others sacrificed to get into the theater and movies, she became an actress and dancer to pay for her art education. "Although I had very little talent and no love of performing, I did have a photogenic face and plenty of nerve." She acted and danced in many small film and television roles. McAfee appeared in Robert Aldrich’s film noir classic Kiss Me Deadly (1955) (the nurse looking down at Mike Hammer when he awakes in the hospital) as well as in My Sister Eileen (1955), Man with a Gun (1955), Pal Joey (1957), on The Phil Silvers Show (c. 1956) as "Corporal Sandberg," and on Groucho Marx’s You Bet Your Life.

McAfee began exhibiting her work at New York's Amel Gallery in 1962 to mild critical acclaim. Her early works included references to national heroes (George Washington, John F. Kennedy), boxers, burlesque dancers, business men, comic book characters, fashion models, and Keane waifs. Her paintings were included in major early Pop shows such as Pop Goes the Easel (1963), Mixed Media and Pop Art (1963), and Pop Art USA (1964).

McAfee later became an illustrator for National Lampoon in the 1970s. She produced numerous parodic illustrations for the humor magazine, many of which were featured on the cover. They often spoofed classic works of Western art, sometimes with a feminist twist. The most well known of her covers was the cover of the August 1978 issue titled "Today's Teens". Some cover examples include:

- Cover Illustration for the October 1973, Vol. 1, No. 43 Issue. Parody of Vincent van Gogh's self-portrait series. McAfee's version features the artist with his head bandaged holding his severed ear with a banana in it. The headline reads: "Banana. What? Banana Issue. What? BANANA ISSUE. What?..."
- Cover Illustration for the December 1974, Vol. 1, No. 57 Issue. Illustration shows the Virgin Mary and baby Jesus being thrown out of the house by her angry father and a somewhat more sympathetic mother. The headline reads: "The Judeo-Christian Tradition: The Joy of Sects."
- Cover Illustration for the August 1978, Vol. 1, No. 101 Issue. Illustration is a Norman Rockwell style parody depicting Brooke Shields as a pouting young teenager chastised by her angry hippie parents. The headline reads: "Today's Teens. They have no respect for their elders, they dress like bums and their music is just noise."

Her re-interpretation of Édouard Manet's Le Déjeuner sur l'herbe, in which the men appear naked and the women are clothed, was published in Titters: The First Collection of Humor by Women (1976).

In 1974 she illustrated an edition of Aldous Huxley's Brave New World.

== Selected exhibitions ==
- 1962 [Solo exhibition], Amel Gallery, New York NY
- 1963 Pop Goes the Easel, Contemporary Arts Museum, Houston TX
- 1963 Mixed Media and Pop Art, Buffalo Fine Arts Academy and Albright-Knox Art Gallery, Buffalo NY
- 1963 [Solo exhibition], Amel Gallery, New York NY
- 1964 Pop Art USA, Oakland Museum of California

== Bibliography ==
- Sid Sachs and Kalliopi Minioudaki, Seductive Subversion: Women Pop Artists, 1958–1968. Philadelphia, PA: University of the Arts, Philadelphia, 2010.
- Andrew Sullivan, "The Daily Dish: Manet Inverted," The Atlantic.com, February 27, 2006.
- Milton Charles, introd. by P.J. O'Rourke, The Art of Mara McAfee. New York: Simon & Schuster, 1981.
- John Russell and Suzi Gablik. Pop Art Redefined. New York: Frederick A. Praeger, 1969.
- S.C.F., "Mara McAfee", ARTnews (November 1963), p. 54.
- S.T., "Mara McAfee", Arts Magazine v. 37 (December 1962), p. 48.
- T.A.S., "Mara McAfee", ARTnews (November 1962), p. 52.
- Brian O'Doherty, "Art: Did You Hear the One About Mara McAfee? Old Jokes on Canvas in Her Show at Amel Gallery," New York Times, October 13, 1962, p. 17.
