= Chris Miller (writer) =

American author and screenwriter

Chris Miller

John Christian Miller (born 1942 in Brooklyn) is an American author and screenwriter. He is best known for his work on National Lampoon magazine and the film Animal House, which he also acted in with co-writer/actor Douglas Kenney. The latter was inspired by Miller's own experiences in the Alpha Delta Phi fraternity at Dartmouth College, in which he went by the name "Pinto". Miller graduated from Dartmouth in 1963.

== Filmography ==
Year	Title	Actor	Writer	Role(s)
1978	National Lampoon's Animal House	Yes	Yes	Curtis "Hardbar" Wayne Fuller
1979	Delta House	No	Yes	
1982	Square Pegs	No	Yes	
1986	Club Paradise	No	Yes	
1986	Sidekicks	No	Yes	
1987	The New Gidget	No	Yes	
1996	Multiplicity	No	Yes	
1997	Perversions of Science	No	Yes	
2003	Where Are They Now?: A Delta Alumni Update	Yes	No	Curtis "Hardbar" Wayne Fuller
2015	Drunk Stoned Brilliant Dead	Yes	No	Himself
2020	Belushi	Yes	No	Himself

== Bibliography ==
- Screw (1968)
- National Lampoon (1970)
- National Lampoon's Animal House: The Full-Color, Illustrated Novel from the Hit Movie (1978)
- The Real Animal House: The Awesomely Depraved Saga of the Fraternity That Inspired the Movie (2006)
