= Douglas Kenney =

American comedy writer (1946–1980)

- Born: Douglas Clark Francis Kenney; December 10, 1946; West Palm Beach, Florida, U.S.
- Died: August 27, 1980 (aged 33); Kauaʻi, Hawaii, U.S.
- Occupations: Screenwriter, magazine editor
- Spouse: Alexandra Appleton Garcia-Mata (m. 1970; div. 1973)
- Partner: Kathryn Walker (c. 1976–1980, his death)
- Writing career
- Years active: 1965–1980
- Genres: Surreal humour, black comedy, wit

Douglas Clark Francis Kenney (December 10, 1946 – August 27, 1980) was an American comedy writer of magazine, novels, radio, TV and film, who co-founded the magazine National Lampoon in 1970. Kenney edited the magazine and wrote much of its early material. He went on to write, produce, and perform in the influential comedies Animal House and Caddyshack.

== Early life ==
Douglas Clark Francis Kenney was born in West Palm Beach, Florida, to Estelle "Stephanie" (née Karch) and Daniel Harold "Harry" Kenney, both originally from Massachusetts. His paternal grandparents, Daniel J. Kenney and Eleanor Agnes (née Noonan), were of Irish origin. His maternal grandparents, Anthony Karczewski and Victoria Lesniak, were Polish. He was named for General Douglas MacArthur. His family moved to Mentor, Ohio, in the early 1950s, before settling in Chagrin Falls, Ohio, a suburb of Cleveland. Kenney lived in Chagrin Falls from 1958 to 1964 and attended Gilmour Academy, a Catholic prep high school for boys in nearby Gates Mills, Ohio.

== Career ==
=== National Lampoon ===
While at Harvard University, Kenney was a member of the Signet Society, president of the Spee Club and editor of The Harvard Lampoon. Kenney frequently collaborated with Henry Beard; the two wrote the short novel Bored of the Rings, which was published in 1969. Kenney graduated in 1968. Beard and fellow Harvard alumnus Robert Hoffman founded the humor magazine National Lampoon.

Kenney was one of the originating forces of what became known during the 1970s as the "new wave" of comedy: a dark, irreverent style of humor that Kenney used as the basis for the magazine. Kenney was editor-in-chief from 1970 to 1972, senior editor from 1973 to 1974 and editor from 1975 to 1976. Thomas Carney, writing in New Times, traced the history and style of the National Lampoon and the impact it had on comedy's new wave. "The National Lampoon," Carney wrote, "was the first full-blown appearance of non-Jewish humor in years — not anti-Semitic, just non-Jewish. Its roots were W.A.S.P. and Irish Catholic, with a weird strain of Canadian detachment... This was not Jewish street-smart humor as a defense mechanism; this was slash-and-burn stuff that alternated in pitch but moved very much on the offensive. It was always disrespect everything, mostly yourself, a sort of reverse deism."

Kenney wrote much of the National Lampoon's early material, such as "Mrs. Agnew's Diary", a regular column purporting to be the diary of Spiro Agnew's wife, chronicling her life, Richard Nixon, and other famous politicians. The feature was an Americanized version of Private Eye's long-running column "Mrs. Wilson's Diary", written from the viewpoint of Prime Minister Harold Wilson's wife.

To escape the pressures of running a successful magazine, Kenney sometimes took unannounced extended breaks; despite these absences, "Mrs. Agnew's Diary" was always submitted to the Lampoon. During one of these breaks he wrote a comic novel, Teenage Commies from Outer Space. Kenney threw the manuscript in the trash after Beard reacted to it negatively. Beard said the book made no sense and was all over the place.

National Lampoon 1964 High School Yearbook Parody, which Kenney co-wrote with P. J. O'Rourke, was the best-selling edition of the magazine. It was based on an earlier two-page piece by Kenney and Michael O'Donoghue, a National Lampoon writer and editor.

Kenney had a five-year buyout contract with the Lampoon's publisher, Twenty First Century Communications. Kenney, Beard, and Hoffman took advantage of this, dividing a sum of $7 million among them. Kenney remained on the staff until 1977, when he left the magazine to co-write the screenplay to National Lampoon's Animal House with Chris Miller and Harold Ramis.

Kenney said of his time with the National Lampoon:

The Harvard Lampoon was my "animal house". I didn't want it to end, so I got Matty to make it a national magazine. Now, as I look back at the past decade, I see a group of about 30 people that I have worked with again and again. I expect to work with them for the next ten years. We were the generation that discovered that alienation is funny. We found that if you take an existentialist, add a hot Camaro, a skateboard, and a lot of dope, you have a working, vital existentialist who can get a job at the National Lampoon."

Kenney had a small background role in Animal House as Delta fraternity brother "Stork", with one line of dialogue. Kenney selected this role for himself as he felt it was the one that fit him best. Produced on a very modest budget, National Lampoon's Animal House was, until Ghostbusters in 1984, the most profitable comedy film in Hollywood history.

=== Caddyshack ===
Kenney produced and wrote Caddyshack with Brian Doyle-Murray and Harold Ramis. Kenney also had a small role in Caddyshack as a dinner guest of Al Czervik's.

When Caddyshack opened to negative reviews from critics in July 1980 despite being a box-office success, Kenney became deeply depressed, although Ramis joked that the film was "a six-million-dollar scholarship to film school".

== Death ==
Kenney and Chevy Chase went to Maui, Hawaii, in the summer of 1980. About three weeks into the vacation, Chase left for a work commitment while Kenney's girlfriend, Kathryn Walker, arrived to keep Kenney company. After a short visit, she returned to Los Angeles. Chase was preparing to return to Hawaii when he received a telephone call telling him that Kenney was missing.

Kenney had traveled alone to the island of Kauaʻi on August 26, 1980. On August 27, he fell to his death from a 35-foot (11 m) cliff called the Hanapepe Valley Lookout. Police found his rental car near the lookout point the following day, and his body was located on August 31.

Paul Krassner, who had worked with Kenney before, wrote about Kenney's death: "There were rumors that he had committed suicide. I didn’t believe it. Not only had we planned to meet, but John Landis, the director of Animal House, said Doug also wanted to see him back in Los Angeles when he returned from Hawaii." Found in Kenney's hotel room were notes for projects he had been planning, jokes, and an outline for a new movie. A gag line that he had left was also discovered: "These last few days are among the happiest I've ever ignored."

His death was classified as accidental by Kauaʻi police.

The National Lampoon published a tribute to him by Matty Simmons, as well as a cartoon showing a sign reading "Doug Kenney Slipped Here" next to the edge of a cliff.

Krassner described Kenney's wake:

I attended a memorial wake for Doug on the rooftop of the Magic Castle in Hollywood. There was an all-you-can-eat buffet provided by a Japanese restaurant. [A friend] and I considered starting a food fight, inspired by that scene in Animal House in honor of Doug — 'He would have wanted it that way' — but we decided it would be in terrible taste, and out of respect for all the other mourners, we resisted the temptation." (Note: The 2018 film A Futile and Stupid Gesture, about Kenney and the rise and fall of the National Lampoon, features a food fight at Kenney's wake, though it is started by Henry Beard, not Krassner.)

== Legacy ==
Kenney received a nomination from The Writers Guild of America for his National Lampoon's Animal House screenplay (along with Harold Ramis and Chris Miller).

The June 1985 issue of National Lampoon, titled "The Doug Kenney Collection", was dedicated entirely to Kenney and contained a compilation of all of his contributions.

Chris Miller paid homage by naming the main character in his 1996 film Multiplicity "Doug Kinney".

Twenty-six years after Kenney's death, the book A Futile and Stupid Gesture: How Doug Kenney and National Lampoon Changed Comedy Forever was published. Written by Josh Karp, it is a biography of Kenney. The book was adapted into the 2018 Netflix feature film A Futile and Stupid Gesture, which stars Will Forte as Kenney and is narrated by Martin Mull, who plays a fictional 70-year-old version of Kenney who had survived into old age.

== Bibliography ==
- Bored of the Rings (1969) (with Henry Beard)
- Harvard Lampoon Time magazine parody (1969) (with Henry Beard)
- National Lampoon (1970–1977) (founder, with Henry Beard and Robert Hoffman)
- National Lampoon 1964 High School Yearbook Parody (1974) (with P. J. O'Rourke)

== Filmography ==
Year	Title	Actor	Producer	Writer	Role(s)
1977	Between The Lines	Yes	No	No	Doug Henkel
1978	National Lampoon's Animal House	Yes	No	Yes	Dwayne "Stork" Storkman
1980	Caddyshack	Yes	Yes	Yes	Al Czervik's Dinner Guest (uncredited)
1981	Heavy Metal	Yes	No	No	Regolian (segment "Captain Sternn") (voice, posthumous release)

Executive producer

- Modern Problems (1981) (posthumous release)
