= Sean Kelly (writer) =

Canadian humorist and writer (1940–2022)

- Born: July 22, 1940 Cushing, Quebec, Canada
- Died: July 11, 2022 (aged 81) Brooklyn, New York, U.S.
- Occupation: Writer, Humorist
- Education: Loyola College
- Employer: National Lampoon (1971–1984)
- Notable works: Lemmings; Diamonds
- Notable awards: Drama Desk Award; Emmy Award
- Spouse: Patricia Todd
- Children: 5

Seán Kelly (July 22, 1940 – July 11, 2022) was a Canadian humorist and writer.

== Biography ==
Sean was born on a farm in Cushing, Quebec, on July 22, 1940. After graduating from Loyola College he worked as a radio actor, advertising copywriter, schoolteacher and on a quiz show.

In 1967, he co-wrote Expo Inside Out, a bestselling but highly unofficial guide to the Montreal World's Fair. In 1972, he migrated to New York City to co-write the infamous off-Broadway mock rock musical Lemmings. He received the Drama Desk Award for his lyrics.

He worked at National Lampoon from 1971 until 1978, becoming an editor and later co-editor-in-chief in 1975. While at the National Lampoon, he co-wrote with Michel Choquette the satirical comic strip Son-O-God, about "a WASP superhero who fights Catholicism", illustrated by Neal Adams.

In 1977, Kelly was a founding editor of the "adult fantasy magazine" Heavy Metal (which was published by National Lampoon), lasting as editor until August 1979. Kelly returned to National Lampoon as a senior editor in 1981 and until 1984 he guided its staff.

As a freelancer, he was eclectic; published in Harper's Bazaar, Benetton's Colors, Interview, Irish America, the Old Farmer's Almanac, Playboy, Spy, The Village Voice, and The Quarterly of Joyce Studies. He reviewed many children's books for The New York Times.

Of his contribution to the Off-Broadway musical Diamonds (1984), Christian Science Monitor critic John Beaufort wrote, "Certainly the most exotic parody of the occasion is Sean Kelly's hilarious Kasi Atta Batt, which turns out to be a Japanese Kabuki version, complete with lion dancer and samurai, of the lament known to untutored Western ears as Casey at the Bat."

He worked extensively in children’s television: for CBS's Young People's Concerts and Drawing Power, for the Fox series Goosebumps and The Magic School Bus, and for the PBS series Shining Time Station and Noddy and Friends. His only Emmy (2004) was for the early literacy PBS series, Between the Lions.

He also participated in "adult television" – including a brief stint on Saturday Night Live, two attempted baseball/variety shows, a sit-com series, a couple of crime dramas, and the re-re-cycling of Woodstock; he appeared on the small screen hosting a PBS arts show, trying to swim in a suit of armor, and dressed as a beaver. He created material for John Candy, George Carlin, Jane Curtin, Robert Klein, Steve Martin, Martin Mull, Gilda Radner, and Jonathan Winters.

He contributed lyrics to music by Steve Goodman, Christopher Guest, Paul Jacobs, Joe Raposo, Paul Shaffer, and Jim Steinman.

He wrote (or co-wrote) many books, only one of which has been translated into Japanese, including a number of collaborations with Rosemary Rogers.

== Personal life and death ==
He first married Valerie Marchant, then Norma Lewis, which both ended with divorce. He finally married to Patricia Todd. He had five children. He died from heart and renal failure on July 11, 2022, at the age of 81 in a hospital in Manhattan.

== Books ==
- 1978 (with Ted Mann) Slightly Higher in Canada
- 1982 (with Ted Mann) The Secret: A Treasure Hunt
- 1982 (editor) Irish Folk and Fairy Tales
- 1983 (with Tony Hendra) Not the Bible
- 1984 A Book Called Bob
- 1987 (with Trish Todd) Grosseries — illustrated by Rick Meyerowitz
- 1987 (with Ron Hauge) Nicknames/Unusual Monikers, Secret Identities, Remarkable Aliases, Hilarious Histories
- 1987 Spitting Images
- 1987 (with Warren Leight and Charles Rubin) 101 Ways to Answer the Request: "Would You Please Put Out That #(!&)"
- 1990 (with Henry Beard, Christopher Cerf, and Sarah Durkee) The Book of Sequels
- 1993 (with Ron Hauge) Boom Baby Moon
- 1993 (with Rosemary Rogers) Saints Preserve Us!: Everything You Need to Know About Every Saint You'll Ever Need
- 1996 (with Chris Kelly and Ron Barrett) Herstory: Lisa Marie's Wedding Diary: Shamelessly Concocted
- 1996 (with Rosemary Rogers and I. Clement) Who in Hell...: A Guide to the Whole Damned Bunch
- 1999 (with Rosemary Rogers) How to Be Irish (Even If You Already Are)
- 2001 (with Rosemary Rogers) The Birthday Book of Saints: Your Powerful Personal Patrons of Every Blessed Day of the Year
- 2003 The Saint-a-Day Guide: A Lighthearted but Accurate Compendium
- 2004 (with Chris Kelly) Bush Photo Oops: Presidential Photo Ops Gone Awry
