= Michael O'Donoghue =

American actor and writer (1940–1994)

- Born: Michael Henry Donohue; January 5, 1940; Sauquoit, New York, U.S.
- Died: November 8, 1994 (aged 54); New York City, New York, U.S.
- Occupations: Writer; editor; actor; comedian
- Spouses: Janice Bickel (m. 1963; ann. 1964) Cheryl Hardwick (m. 1986)
- Writing career
- Years active: 1964–1994
- Genre: Black humor

Michael O'Donoghue (January 5, 1940 – November 8, 1994) was an American writer, actor, editor and comedian.

He was known for his dark and destructive style of comedy and humor, and was a major contributor to National Lampoon magazine. He was the first head writer of Saturday Night Live and the first performer to deliver a line on the series.

== Early life ==
O'Donoghue was born Michael Henry Donohue in Sauquoit, New York. His father, Michael, worked as an engineer, while his mother, Barbara, stayed home to raise him.

O'Donoghue's early career included work as a playwright and stage actor at the University of Rochester where he drifted in and out of school beginning in 1959. His first published writing appeared in the school's humor magazine Ugh!

After a brief time working as a writer in San Francisco, California, O'Donoghue returned to Rochester and participated in regional theater. During this period, he formed a group called Bread and Circuses specifically to perform his early plays which were of an experimental nature and often quite disturbing to the local audience. Among these are an absurdist work exploring themes of sadism entitled "The Twilight Maelstrom of Cookie Lavagetto", a cycle of one-act plays called Le Theatre de Malaise and the 1964 dark satire The Death of JFK.

His first work of greater note was the picaresque feature "The Adventures of Phoebe Zeit-Geist", published as a serial in Evergreen Review. This was an erotic satire of the comic book genre, later released in revised and expanded form as a book by that magazine's publisher, Grove Press. Drawn by Frank Springer, the comic detailed the adventures of debutante Phoebe Zeit-Geist as she was variously kidnapped and rescued by a series of bizarre Inuit, Nazis, Chinese foot fetishists, lesbian assassins and other characters. Doonesbury comic-strip creator Garry Trudeau cited the strip as an early inspiration, saying, "[A] very heavy influence was a serial in the Sixties called 'Phoebe Zeitgeist'. . . . It was an absolutely brilliant, deadpan send-up of adventure comics, but with a very edgy modernist kind of approach. To this day, I hold virtually every panel in my brain. It's very hard not to steal from it."

In 1968, O'Donoghue worked with illustrator and fellow Evergreen Review veteran Phil Wende to create the illustrated book The Incredible, Thrilling Adventures of the Rock. Biographer Dennis Perrin described it as having "no plot. The same rock sits in the same spot in the same forest for thousands of years. Nothing much happens. Then, while two boys roam the wood in search of a Christmas tree, one sees the rock and is inspired."

Taking the idea to the publisher Random House, the pair sold the book to the young editor Christopher Cerf. Cerf was a former member of the Harvard Lampoon, and O'Donoghue's first acquaintance from that group. Through Cerf, O'Donoghue would meet George W. S. Trow and other former Lampoon writers looking to start a national comedy magazine.

In 1969, O'Donoghue and Trow co-wrote the script for the James Ivory / Ismail Merchant film Savages. This film tells the story of a tribe of prehistoric "Mud People" who happen upon a deserted Gatsby-esque 1930s manor house. The Mud People evolve into contemporary high-society types who enjoy a decadent weekend party at the manor before ultimately devolving back into Mud People. Savages was eventually released in 1972.

== National Lampoon magazine ==
O'Donoghue was, along with Henry Beard and Doug Kenney, a founding writer and later an editor for the satiric National Lampoon magazine. As one of many outstanding National Lampoon contributors, O'Donoghue created some of the distinctive black comedy which characterized the magazine's flavor for most of its first decade. His most famous contributions include "The Vietnamese Baby Book", in which a baby's war wounds are cataloged in a keepsake; the "Ezra Taft Benson High School Yearbook", a precursor to the Lampoon's High School Yearbook Parody; the comic "Tarzan of the Cows"; and the continuing feature "Underwear for the Deaf". Two of his parodies were reprinted in the anthology National Lampoon: This Side of Parodies (Warner Paperback Library, 1974).

He was also the editor and main contributor to the Lampoon's Encyclopedia of Humor. He co-wrote the album Radio Dinner with Tony Hendra, and because of the album's success, he was assigned to direct and act on The National Lampoon Radio Hour. After 13 episodes, publisher Matty Simmons asked O'Donoghue to return to the magazine. A week later, O'Donoghue and Simmons argued over what was later revealed to be a simple misunderstanding, and O'Donoghue left.

It was at the Lampoon that O'Donoghue met Anne Beatts, with whom he became romantically involved. The two later moved on to work at Saturday Night Live together.

== Saturday Night Live ==
On the pioneering late-night sketch comedy program Saturday Night Live (originally called NBC's Saturday Night), creator and executive producer Lorne Michaels hired him as a writer. O'Donoghue appeared in the first show's opening sketch as an English-language teacher, instructing John Belushi to repeat the phrases, "I would like to feed your fingertips to the wolverines", "We are out of badgers. Would you accept a wolverine in its place?" and "'Hey!' Ned exclaimed. 'Let's boil the wolverines.'" before suddenly dropping dead of a heart attack.

Later he made appearances in the persona of a Vegas-style "impressionist" who would pay great praise to showbiz mainstays such as talk show host Mike Douglas and singers Tony Orlando and Dawn—and then speculate how they would react if steel needles with real sharp points were plunged into their eyes. The shrieking fits that followed are believed to be inspired by O'Donoghue's real-life agonies from chronic migraine headaches.

O'Donoghue, in reference to his refusal to write for Jim Henson's Land of Gorch sketches which appeared in the early years of SNL, quipped, "I won't write for felt."

Later, O'Donoghue cultivated the persona of the grim "Mr. Mike", a coldly decadent figure who favored viewers with comically dark "Least-Loved Bedtime Stories" such as "The Little Engine that Died". One of his most notable SNL sketches is the Star Trek spoof "The Last Voyage of the Starship Enterprise" that was a tour-de-force for Belushi.

In 1979, he produced a television special for NBC, featuring most of the SNL cast, called Mr. Mike's Mondo Video. Because of its raunchy content, the network rejected the program, which was then released as a theatrical film.

O'Donoghue returned to SNL in 1981 when new executive producer Dick Ebersol needed an old hand to help revive the faltering series. O'Donoghue's volatile personality and mood swings made this difficult: his first day on the show he screamed at all the cast members, forcing everyone to write on the walls with magic markers. Catherine O'Hara was rumored to have quit SNL after a week and before appearing on-air due to O'Donoghue's volatility. O'Hara denied this account, saying she didn't feel comfortable in New York City and left to return to Second City Television. The only cast member O'Donoghue liked was Eddie Murphy, reportedly because Murphy was not afraid of him. According to the book Live from New York, O'Donoghue tried to shake things up on that first day by saying "this is what the show lacks" and spray-painting the word "DANGER" on the wall of his office.

O'Donoghue was released from the show after writing the never-aired sketch "The Last Days in Silverman's Bunker", which compared NBC network president Fred Silverman's problems at the network to Adolf Hitler's final days. It was planned that John Belushi would return to play Silverman, and a great deal of work had been done on creating sets for the sketch (which would have run for about twenty minutes), including the construction of a large Nazi eagle clutching an NBC corporate logo instead of a swastika. Another unaired O'Donoghue sketch from around the same period, "The Good Excuse", also involved Nazi jokes. In the sketch, a captured German officer berated by his captors for Nazi war crimes explains that he had a good excuse, which he whispers into their ears, inaudible to the viewers. His captors are quickly persuaded that the unheard excuse was, in fact, an acceptable reason for the crimes of the Third Reich.

On October 26, 1986, O'Donoghue was further connected to SNL by virtue of his marriage to the show's musical director, Cheryl Hardwick. The union was fodder for a "Weekend Update" joke in which Dennis Miller noted that the couple was registered at Black+Decker.

O'Donoghue was one of several original writers rehired by Lorne Michaels upon his return to produce the show in 1985. O'Donoghue's intention was to write and direct short films for the show; however, none were completed and he wrote little else, apart from a monologue seemingly designed to humiliate Chevy Chase when he hosted the second show of the season. (The monologue began, "Right after I stopped doing cocaine, I turned into a giant garden slug, and, for the life of me, I don't know why.") The monologue never aired, and O'Donoghue was fired a month later after telling The New York Times that SNL had become "an embarrassment. It's like watching old men die." His final contribution to the show was a song, "Boulevard of Broken Balls", co-written with his wife Hardwick and performed by Christopher Walken on the October 24, 1992 episode.

== Other work ==
O'Donoghue acted in a supporting role in the 1985 comedy Head Office. He had small parts in the 1979 movie Manhattan (which poked fun at SNL), the 1987 movie Wall Street, and the 1988 movie he co-wrote, Scrooged. O'Donoghue said he loathed the theatrical release of Scrooged, insisting until his death that he and co-writer and best friend Mitch Glazer had written a much better film. He also wrote or co-wrote a number of unproduced screenplays, of which the Chevy Chase collaboration Saturday Matinee (a.k.a. Planet of the Cheap Special Effects) remains legendary in Hollywood screenwriter circles.

O'Donoghue also found some success as a country music songwriter, his most notable credit being Dolly Parton's "Single Women" (1982). The song, originally composed for a 1981 SNL skit, later inspired the 1984 ABC TV movie Single Bars, Single Women starring Tony Danza and Jean Smart, which was produced by O'Donoghue.

In 1992, O'Donoghue created a sketch show pilot titled TV for FOX directed by Walter Williams, creator of Mr. Bill, and featuring Kelly Lynch. The pilot was ultimately passed on by the network.

== Death ==
On November 8, 1994, he died of a cerebral hemorrhage at age 54.

== Legacy ==
As a member of Saturday Night Live's original writing staff, O'Donoghue shared two Emmy Awards for Outstanding Writing in a Comedy-Variety or Music Series (1976 and 1977).

He is portrayed by Thomas Lennon in the 2018 film A Futile and Stupid Gesture and Tommy Dewey in the 2024 film Saturday Night.

== Biography ==
Mr. Mike: The Life and Work of Michael O'Donoghue
- Author: Dennis Perrin
- Language: English
- Publisher: Avon Books
- Publication date: July 1998
- Publication place: United States
- Media type: Print
- Pages: 429
- ISBN: 978-0-380-72832-9

Dennis Perrin's biography Mr. Mike: The Life and Work of Michael O'Donoghue was published in 1998 by Avon Books. The dust jacket reads, "This is the unvarnished story of a towering figure in American popular culture, the prime artistic force behind an entire generation of humorists and satirists."

== Writing credits ==
- Evergreen Review (1966, 1969) (Periodical)
- The Adventures of Phoebe Zeit-Geist (with Frank Springer) (1966) (Comic)
- National Lampoon (1970–1974) (Periodical)
- National Lampoon Radio Dinner (with Tony Hendra and Bob Tischler) (1972) (LP)
- The National Lampoon Encyclopedia of Humor (1973) (Editor)
- Savages (with George W.S. Trow) (1972)
- National Lampoon Radio Hour (1973–1974) (Radio)
- Tarzoon: Shame of the Jungle (with Anne Beatts) (1975) (Adaptation)
- Saturday Night Live (1975–1978, 1981; 1985) (TV)
- Gilda Live (with Gilda Radner, Lorne Michaels, Anne Beatts, Rosie Shuster, Alan Zweibel, Marilyn Suzanne Miller, Paul Shaffer and Don Novello) (1980) (Stage/Film)
- Mr. Mike's Mondo Video (with Mitch Glazer, Emily Prager and Dirk Wittenborn) (1979)
- Single Women (1982) (Song)
- Scrooged (with Mitch Glazer) (1988)
- Spin Magazine ("NOT MY FAULT" Column) (1993–1994) (Periodical)

=== Unproduced screenplays ===
- Arrive Alive (with Mitch Glazer)
- Biker Heaven (with Terry Southern and Nelson Lyon)
- Saturday Matinee (with Chevy Chase)
- War of the Insect Gods (with Mitch Glazer, Emily Prager and Dirk Wittenborn)

== Filmography ==
| Year | Title | Role | Notes |
|---|---|---|---|
| 1971 | Dynamite Chicken | | Segment: "Phoebe Zeit-Geist"; writer |
| 1972 | Savages | | Writer |
| 1975–86 | Saturday Night Live | Various roles | Also writer/head writer, supervising producer |
| 1978 | Tarzoon: Shame of the Jungle | | English version; writer |
| 1979 | Manhattan | Dennis | |
| 1979 | Mr. Mike's Mondo Video | Mr. Mike | Also writer, director, producer, composer |
| 1980 | Gilda Live | | Documentary; writer |
| 1980 | The Dreammaster | | Abandoned; writer |
| 1981 | The Midnight Special | | 2 episodes; writer |
| 1983 | Kittens in a Can | | Parody of "women in prison" films; co–scripted with Marilyn Suzanne Miller |
| 1985 | Head Office | Scott Dantley | |
| 1987 | Wall Street | Reporter | |
| 1988 | Scrooged | Priest | Writer |
| 1988 | The Suicide Club | Cardinal Mervin | |
| 1989 | The House Guest | | Unproduced; writer |
| 1990 | Arrive Alive | | Unfinished film; writer |
| 1992 | Itsy Bitsy Spider | | Short film; writer |

== See also ==
- "The Last Voyage of the Starship Enterprise"

== Works cited ==
- Shales, Tom; Miller, James Andrew (2002). Live From New York: An Uncensored History of Saturday Night Live. Boston, Massachusetts: Little, Brown and Company. ISBN 0-316-78146-0.
- Hill, Doug; Weingrad, Jeff (1986). Saturday Night: A Backstage History of Saturday Night Live. Beech Tree Books. ISBN 0-688-05099-9.
- Hendra, Tony (1987). Going Too Far. Dolphin Doubleday. ISBN 0-385-23223-3.
- Perrin, Dennis (1998). Mr. Mike: The Life and Work of Michael O'Donoghue. Avon Books. ISBN 0-380-97330-8.
- Mark's Very Large National Lampoon Site: Michael O'Donoghue
