= Brian McConnachie =

American actor and writer (1942–2024)

- McConnachie in Sleepless in Seattle (1993)
- Born: Brian John McConnachie; December 23, 1942; New York City, U.S.
- Died: January 5, 2024 (aged 81); Venice, Florida, U.S.
- Occupations: Actor; comedian; writer
- Spouse: Ann Crilly
- Children: 1

Brian John McConnachie (December 23, 1942 – January 5, 2024) was an American actor, comedy writer, and children's book author.

== Background ==
McConnachie was born in Manhattan, New York, on December 23, 1942, and raised in Forest Hills, Queens. He attended University College Dublin and also served in the U.S. Army.

== Career ==
During the early 1970s, McConnachie was one of the main writers for National Lampoon, where he authored and co-authored many articles. He left the magazine after four years, but as Rick Meyerowitz wrote, in his 2010 book Drunk Stoned Brilliant Dead, "[McConnachie's Lampoon work] is well loved, here on earth and on his home planet."

In 1978, McConnachie left the Lampoon and joined the writing staff of Saturday Night Live, joining Bill Murray and John Belushi, two friends from The National Lampoon Radio Hour. McConnachie and Belushi remained particularly close until Belushi's death in 1982, and Murray and McConnachie remained friends as well, with McConnachie acting in several of Murray's movies. McConnachie's absurdist sketches for SNL included “Cochise at Oxford” and “Name the Bats.”

In 1982, McConnachie won an Emmy Award as part of the writing team for SCTV; previously, in 1979, he was nominated for an Emmy as part of the writing team for Saturday Night Live. In addition to SCTV and SNL, McConnachie wrote 15 episodes of Noddy and 18 of Shining Time Station. He also wrote an episode of The Simpsons, "The Fabulous Faker Boy," for the show's 24th season.

After leaving SCTV, McConnachie launched The American Bystander, a magazine he variously described as "a hip New Yorker" or "National Lampoon for grown-ups." Though the Bystander had contributions from many of McConnachie's friends from the Lampoon and was initially backed by Belushi, Dan Aykroyd, Lorne Michaels and others, it was unable to secure financing for print distribution beyond its "pilot issue." In 2015, McConnachie partnered with Michael Gerber and Alan Goldberg to relaunch the magazine; the sole issue from 1982 was reprinted in full in Bystander #25 (May 2023).

As an actor, McConnachie appeared in seven films directed by Woody Allen: Husbands and Wives, Bullets Over Broadway, Don't Drink the Water, Deconstructing Harry, Celebrity, Small Time Crooks, and The Curse of the Jade Scorpion. He played a supporting role in Caddyshack as Drew Scott.

== Personal life and death ==
McConnachie was married to the former Ann Crilly for 56 years, and they had one daughter. He died in Venice, Florida, on January 5, 2024, of complications from Parkinson's disease. He was 81.

== Filmography ==
- The TVTV Show (1977)
- Saturday Night Live (1978–1979)
- SCTV Network (1981)
- Encyclopedia (1988)
- Shining Time Station (1989–1993)
- Earthday Birthday (1990)
- Shining Time Station: 'Tis a Gift (1990)
- Shining Time Station: Second Chances (1995)
- Shining Time Station: One of the Family (1995)
- Noddy (1998)
- The Simpsons (2013)

== Bibliography ==
- National Lampoon (1973–1977)
- The Job of Sex: A Working Man's Guide to Productive Lovemaking (1974)
- The Naked and The Nude: Hollywood and Beyond (1977)
- The American Bystander (1983)
- Lily of the Forest (with Jack Ziegler) (1987)
- Blowing Smoke: The Wild and Whimsical World of Cigars (1997)

== Acting ==
This is a list of films that McConnachie has appeared in, and the roles he played in those films.

- People I Know (2002) – Jamie Hoff
- The Curse of the Jade Scorpion (2001) – Voltan's Participant
- Small Time Crooks (2000) – Paul Milton
- Celebrity (1998) – Exercise Tape Fan
- Deconstructing Harry (1997) – Dr. Reese
- Don't Drink the Water (TV film) (1994) – Washington Reporter
- Bullets Over Broadway (1994) – Mitch Sabine
- Six Degrees of Separation (1993) – Mrs. Bannister's Guest
- Sleepless in Seattle (1993) – Bob
- Husbands and Wives (1992) – Rain's Father
- Quick Change (1990) – Bank Manager
- Strange Brew (1983) – Ted
- Caddyshack (1980) – Drew Scott
- Mr. Mike's Mondo Video (1979) – "LaserBra 2000" Scientist
