= Rick Meyerowitz =

American artist and author (born 1943)

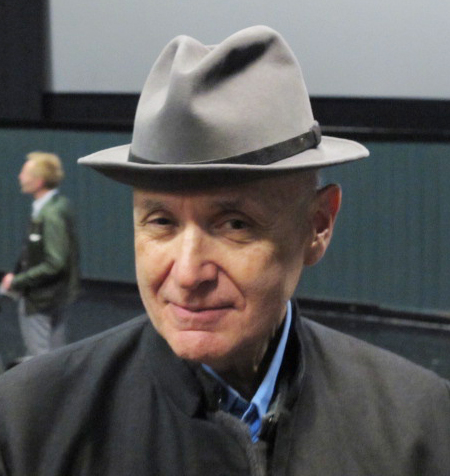
- Meyerowitz at the New York premiere of the film Drunk Stoned Brilliant Dead, Tribeca Film Festival, April 16, 2015
- Born: November 29, 1943 (age 82); The Bronx, New York, U.S.
- Known for: Illustrator, writer

Rick Meyerowitz (born November 29, 1943) is an American artist, and author. He is best known for his work for National Lampoon magazine and its spin-offs, including his posters for the comedy film Animal House.

== Early life ==
Meyerowitz was born in The Bronx, New York. He is the younger brother of photographer Joel Meyerowitz. They grew up in Soundview, Bronx. He started drawing during his childhood and attended art school at Boston University.

== National Lampoon magazine ==
Meyerowitz was a frequent contributor to National Lampoon magazine; memorable artwork of his included the "Mona Gorilla" (the Mona Lisa as a gorilla).

=== The film Animal House ===
Meyerowitz created the widely recognized theatrical release poster for the 1978 comedy movie Animal House.

== Other work ==
Meyerowitz has worked as a commercial artist and as the author and artist of humorous books such as Return of the Nose Masks (1998; a book of punch-out masks to be worn on the nose) and Dodosaurs: The Dinosaurs That Didn't Make It (1983); he has also illustrated children's books (Rip Van Winkle, 2004, for example). Also created the cover illustration depicting the cast of M*A*S*H for the Nov. 2, 1974 issue of TV Guide.

Meyerowitz's collaborations with the artist Maira Kalman produced New Yorkistan, a popular cover for The New Yorker magazine, as well as editorial and humor pieces for The New York Times. Coasters which the two artists designed were for sale at the Museum of Modern Art.

== Book ==
Meyerowitz put together a book about National Lampoon magazine's artists and writers, called Drunk Stoned Brilliant Dead: The Writers and Artists Who Made the National Lampoon Insanely Great. The book was published by Abrams in the fall of 2010.

== Documentary film ==
Meyerowitz was interviewed and drew the theatrical release poster for the 2015 film National Lampoon: Drunk Stoned Brilliant Dead. The director Doug Tirola commented, "Before we shot the first frame of the movie, I had the idea and hope that Rick would do our poster. The Animal House poster, in my mind, is one of the best in the history of film."
