= The National Lampoon Radio Hour =

Comedy radio show

- Advertisement for the program in City on a Hill Press
- Genre: Comedy, satire
- Country of origin: United States
- Language: English
- Starring: John Belushi; Chevy Chase; Richard Belzer; Christopher Guest; Bill Murray; Gilda Radner; Brian Doyle-Murray; Harold Ramis; Joe Flaherty; Cole Escola; Jo Firestone; Brett Davis; Alex English; Maeve Higgins; Aaron Jackson; Rachel Pegram; Lorelei Ramirez; Megan Stalter; Martin Urbano
- Original release: November 17, 1973

The National Lampoon Radio Hour was a comedy radio show which was created, produced and written by staff from National Lampoon magazine.

The show ran weekly, for a little over a year, from November 17, 1973 to December 28, 1974. Originally an hour in length, after 13 weeks it was cut down to half-an-hour due to the difficulty of putting together the very considerable amount of material required for a one-hour show.

== Original series ==
The show was created and produced by Michael O'Donoghue. When O'Donoghue left, later producers included Sean Kelly, Brian McConnachie and John Belushi.

Performers on the show included John Belushi, Chevy Chase, Bill Murray, John DeBella, Gilda Radner, and Harold Ramis, who was one of the co-writers for National Lampoon's Animal House. Other writers and performers on the show included Anne Beatts, Richard Belzer, Christopher Cerf, Brian Doyle-Murray, Joe Flaherty, Christopher Guest, who did many of the show's musical parodies, Ed Subitzky, Douglas Kenney (another co-writer of Animal House) and Bruce McCall.

The Radio Hour was recorded in a studio specially built at the National Lampoon offices at 635 Madison Avenue, New York City. The musical theme for the show was co-written and performed by Bob Hoban and Nate Herman.

The show was broadcast nationally on 600 different radio stations, but the stations picking it up were free to air it at any time they chose. It proved difficult to get enough advertising to support the series: national sponsors seemed reluctant to take on the show, probably because of the controversial nature of much of its material.

When the show folded, several of the performers and writers moved on to Saturday Night Live. Michael O'Donoghue was head writer for the first three seasons of Saturday Night Live, and this may explain why some of the radio show material, such as "What if Ed Sullivan Were Tortured?" was subsequently re-purposed for television. Ramis and Flaherty instead joined SCTV.

Two examples of the sometimes shocking humor of the Radio Hour are sketches featuring game shows entitled "Catch it and Keep it" (prizes - some quite lethal - are dropped from a great height to the crowd below), and "Land a Million" (in which a housewife is left alone in an airborne Boeing 747 containing $1 million in cash and a ton of TNT and must answer questions about literature in order to receive tips on how to land the plane safely).

== Albums ==
National Lampoon released 5 albums that were created entirely with, or partly with, material from the Radio Hour:

- The Missing White House Tapes (1974)
- Gold Turkey (1975)
- That's Not Funny, That's Sick (1977)
- Greatest Hits of the National Lampoon (1978)
- National Lampoon White Album (1979).

Gold Turkey was also subsequently issued as a CD. In 1996 Rhino Records released a multi-CD/tape box set, The Best of the National Lampoon Radio Hour, which borrowed one of the magazine's classic covers ("Buy this box or we'll shoot this dog"). The set includes many of the best sketches, and has extensive liner notes detailing the history of the show.

National Lampoon also released 3 albums that predated the Radio Hour. Several items from these earlier works were either reworked, or made it on to the Radio Hour in their original format:

- National Lampoon Radio Dinner (1972)
- National Lampoon's Lemmings (1973)
- Official National Lampoon Stereo Test and Demonstration Record (1974)

== Reboot podcast ==
In 2019, the show was rebooted as a podcast in partnership with the Forever Dog podcast network, with a new cast, featuring Cole Escola, Jo Firestone, Brett Davis, Alex English, Maeve Higgins, Aaron Jackson, Rachel Pegram, River L. Ramirez, Megan Stalter and Martin Urbano. The show also featured a number of guest performers, including: Rachel Dratch, Amy Sedaris, Chris Gethard & Jordan Klepper.
