= Michael J. Weller =

British artist

Space Opera: The Artist's Book, Michael J. Weller (Visual Associations, 2000)

London's bookartbookshop exhibition catalogue, Mike Weller - the first thirty years, September 2005

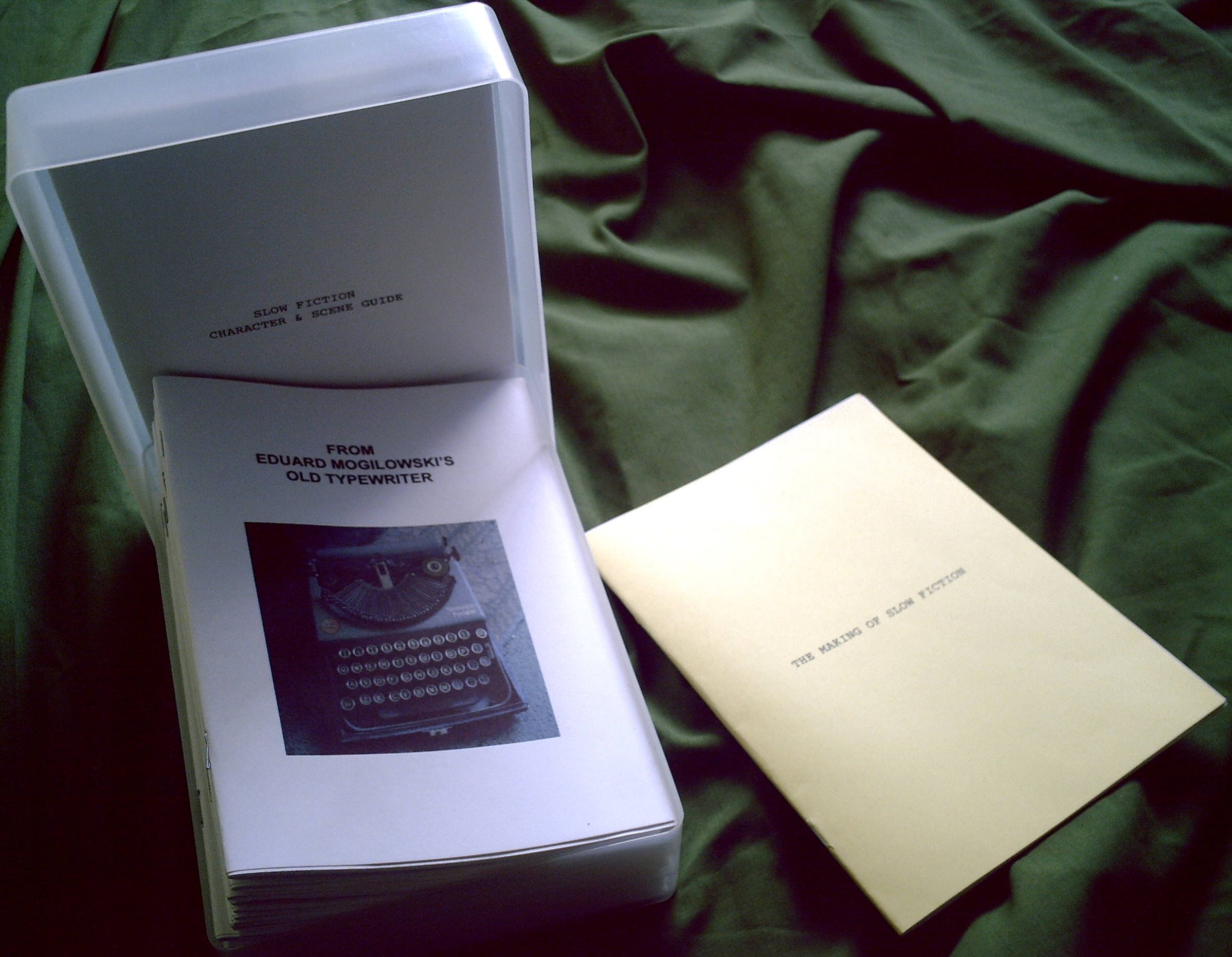
Slow Fiction: twenty-three tales in a box, Michael J. Weller (homebakedbooks, 2010)

Michael John Weller (South London, 1946) is a British underground comics artist, political writer, cartoonist, activist and album-cover designer.

Weller designed the sleeve for the United States release of David Bowie's The Man Who Sold the World LP (Mercury, 1970), re-released (EMI CD 1999 and Metrobolist LP, CD, streaming formats, Parlophone, 2020).

M. J. Weller's visual and textual art first appeared on colourised pages of Oz magazine issues 35 and 36 (UK 1971). As "Captain Stelling" Weller wrote and drew The Firm (cOZmic Comics, 1972) - an early British artist's publication inspired by American underground comic book innovations. In 1973, a page by "Stelling" entitled 'Missile Crisis' was made part of Michel Choquette's comic book The Someday Funnies. In the 1970s Weller was published by Hunt Emerson for Birmingham Arts Lab press. He followed "Willie D" (Andrew Marr) as featured cartoonist on Chainsaw punk zine (1980–84).

Michael Weller enjoyed a parallel career in the 1980s and 1990s as political writer, cartoonist, activist of the left, and local community organiser based in Penge, south London. In 2006 he became a signatory to the Euston Manifesto.

As 'M.J.', 'Michael John', 'Mick' and 'Mike' Weller - using identity-playing forenames, nicknames and other noms-de-plume - he has produced artists books, comics, zines ("spineless wonders") and small press publications. Affiliated to Association of Little Presses Weller opened self-publishing imprint homebakedbooks 2005–2023 now on the Internet Archive's Wayback Machine . Between 1990 and 2010 he was associated with London's poetry scene. Launch of Beat Generation Ballads was documented in video by Voiceworks (2011), becoming the title of a large-scale musical composition for piano by Michael Finnissy premiered at Huddersfield Contemporary Music Festival in 2014, winning a solo British Composer Award 2015.

Beowulf Cartoon has been on reading display at Poetry Library exhibitions Visual Poetics (2013) and Poetry Comics (2015).

Michael John Weller continues to write, draw, and publish for traditional print and digital mediums, including artists film, poetry glitch and The Metrobolist website.

== Bookworks ==
- Harriet Staunton: A Victorian Murder Ballad, (Visual Associations, 1999)
- Space Opera: The Artist's Book, (Visual Associations, 2000)
- Madeline My Love In Death And Fancy, (Visual Associations, 2001)
- Beowulf Cartoon, (Writers Forum & Visual Associations, 2004)
- Three-part The Secret Blue Book, (homebakedbooks, 2005)
- Slow Fiction: twenty-three tales in a box, (homebakedbooks, 2010)
- Beat generation Ballads, (Veer Books, 2011)
- minimus post ode poem, (zimZalla avant objects/object 021, 2014)
- Metrobolist: Five Chapters, (homebakedbooks, 2015)
- Three Piece Bathing Suit, (Blart Books, 2016)
- Spurious Purple: 72 serial e-shots from 2016, (HomeBaked, 2017)
- intermittent, (HomeBaked, 2018)
- Old New Little Presses In The Age of Electronic Reproduction, (LUMIN, May 2019 objectzine edition)
- Metrobolist 7, (Veer Books/bookartobject, April 2021)
- An Open Letter To J.K. Rowling From You-Know-Who, (Yar Mouth Press, 2022 - 20th anniversary edition)

== Selected comics, pamphlets and zines ==
- the bop that just won't stop!, 1979 Birmingham Arts Lab Press (Ar-Zak Microcomik 7)
- Coffin' Blood, 1979
- AIN'T BIN TO NO ART SCHOOL (a design for modern living),1980
- the power of rock n'roll zerox poemik, 1980
- A SONG FOR EUROPE, sheet music, 1983 (Pop Laboratory)
- Pinball and the Perfect Lasagne (with Phil Mellows and Colin Greenland), 1984 (Pop Laboratory)
- Systemize, Buiiding a D-I-Y Cartoon System, 1985
- Fantasy number one, 1990 (itma)
- Four-Eyed Flicks, 1993
- The Fabulous Five, The comical story of the Arbiter, 1993
- Too Much to Dream, 1994
- Sugar Paper Rebellion, 1994 (visual associations)
- Michael's Collected Chainsaw Cartoons 1980-1984, 1996 (visual associations) ISBN 0952813505
- My Own Zine nos. 1 and 2, 1996-1997 (visual associations)
- Sortilege of Allotment, 1997 (visual associations)
- Detective Notes, Around the world with The Imaginative Traveller, 1997
- squad car Verethrangna, More Detective Notes (with Bill Griffiths and R), 1997
- YES WE WERE SECRET LOVER(S), (visual associations), 1997
- The Ballad of Harriet Staunton, A Life Part 1: South London, 1998 (visual associations)
- The Siege of Carlaverock, (with Bill Griffiths), 1998 (visual associations)
- b, 1998
- The Boys Are Back In Town, 1999 (visual associations) ISBN 0952813572
- k, 1999
- G a poem of no more, 1999
- Space Opera, a comic book series 1997-1999 (visual associations) ISSN 1367-0417
- Passing Futures, 1999 (visual associations) ISBN 0952813580
- W, 2000 (visual associations) ISBN 0953645908
- Cobbled, 2000 (visual associations)
- Sublimage, 2000 (visual associations)
- Atterdake Ryst, 2000 (visual associations) ISBN 0953645932
- Idiotgram, 2000 (writers forum)
- S Club 7 versus the Anti-Capitalists, 2000 (visual associations)
- The Story of Republic Nine, 2000 (visual associations) ISBN 0953645959
- A Pigment of Imagination, 2001 (visual associations) ISBN 0953645975
- Hitcloh Ilk, 2001 (visual associations) ISBN 0953645983
- visual associations, 2001 (visual associations) ISBN 0953645991
- Climb a Free Wheeler, 2001 (writers forum) ISBN 1842540327
- Beowulf: An Old Old Story, 2002 (Scribblers Editions)
- Stem Harvest, nature poems, 2002 (writers forum)
- An Open Letter To J.K. Rowling From You-Know-Who, 2002 (Scribblers Editions)
- The Boy and Girl who looked up at the sky in wonder, 2005 (homebakedbooks)
- Mike's Yellow Fever, 2005 (homebakedbooks)
- Redell Olsen's Sharp Exhalations, 2005 (homebakedbooks)
- Mechanically Inadvisable, the tale of Joe Shuster and Jerry Siegel, 2006 (homebakedbooks)
- My Own Zine nos. 1 and 2, 2006-2007 (homebakedbooks)
- The Mother Of All Mermaids, a tale of magical realism, 2007 (homebakedbooks)
- Andrea Brady Poetry Lady, 2008 (homebakedbooks)
- Madeline My Love in Death and Fancy, 2009 (homebakedbooks)
- home'baked, literary artzines in the age of the internet, 2010 (homebakedbooks)
- Holly Pester Does It Better, 2010 (homebakedbooks)
- Percy Bysshe Shelley's Masque of Anarchy Covered as a Zine, 2013 (homebakedbooks)
- Grave's End, ghosting about horror, 2013 (homebakedbooks)
- Zine Tales, 2013–2014
- (site under construction), novel biro, 2015
- Poetry Womble, 2017
- Litleaf, 2014–2019
- LeafLit/LitLeaf, European Poetry Festival zine, December 2, 2023
- BABELEUM, glitchobject score sheet zine, August 9, 2024
- poetry cartoon, Advent calendar (Crater 72, December 2024) ISSN 2041-0948
- 1961, (...it's trad, dad...), January 2026
