= Ed Subitzky =

American writer and artist

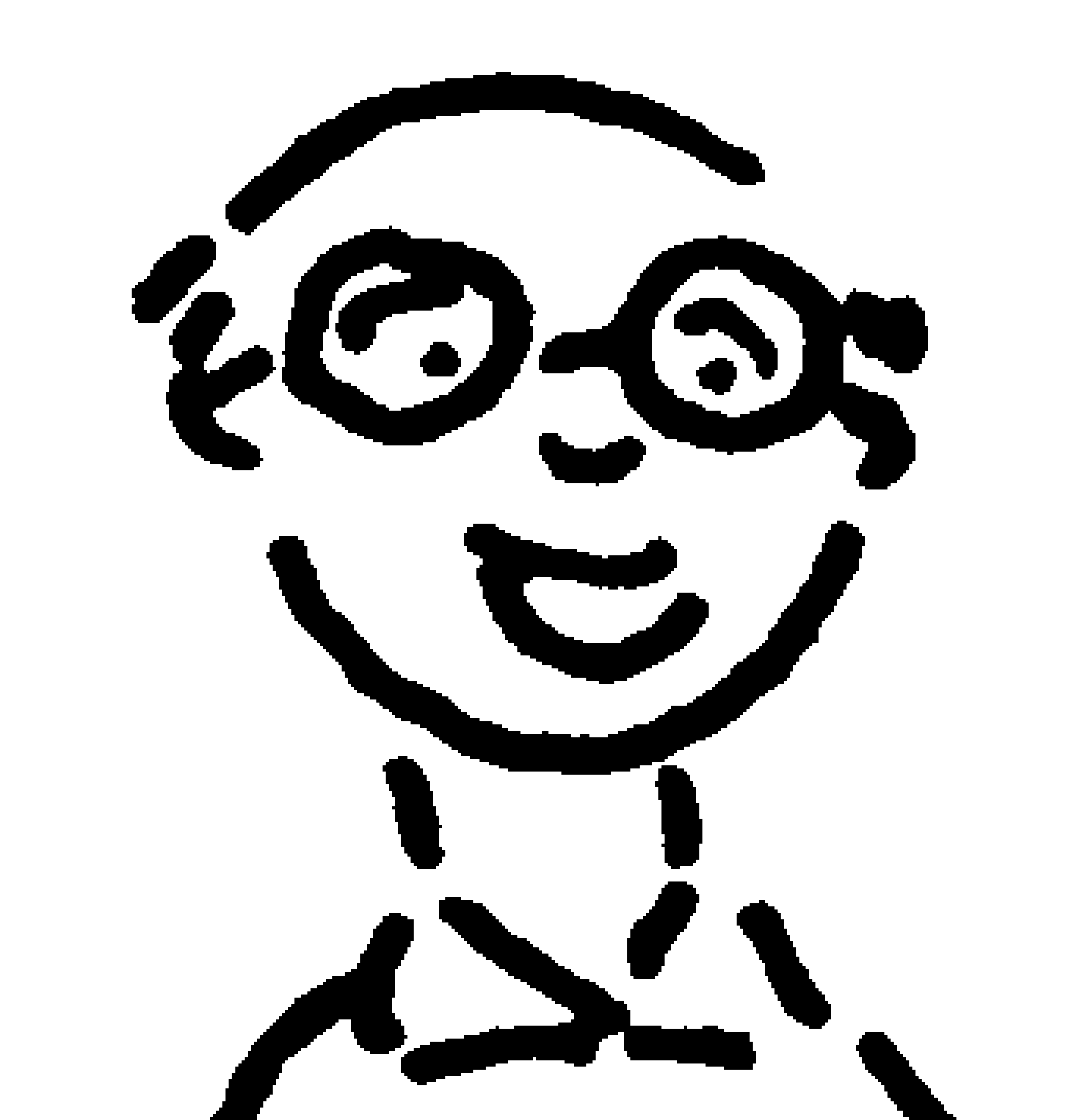
- A detail of a self-portrait from circa 1995
- Born: March 19, 1943 (age 83); Mount Vernon, New York, United States
- Occupations: Writer, Cartoonist
- Writing career
- Period: 1968 – present
- Genres: Humor and comedy, also horror, fantasy, and philosophy

Ed Subitzky, full name Edward Jack Subitzky (born March 19, 1943), is an American writer and artist. He is best known as a cartoonist, comics artist, and humorist. He has worked as a television comedy writer and performer, a writer and performer of radio comedy, and a writer of radio drama. He has also created comedy and humor in other media. Subitzky is a member of the Screen Actors Guild-American Federation of Television and Radio Artists, and the Writers Guild of America.

In the early 1970s, Subitzky became a long-term contributing editor at National Lampoon magazine, where he worked with many well-regarded humor and comedy creators including Henry Beard, Doug Kenney, Michael O'Donoghue, P. J. O'Rourke, and Michael Gross. Subitzky also wrote for, and voice acted with National Lampoon comedy performers John Belushi and Chevy Chase, in many episodes of the National Lampoon Radio Hour. Subitzky also directed John Belushi and Chevy Chase on Subitzky's Lampoon comedy record album, the Official National Lampoon Stereo Test and Demonstration Record.

Subitzky went on to various other kinds of humor and comedy work, including appearing on television multiple times with David Letterman, and more work for radio. He has also written broadcast horror stories.

During the 1990s, several comic strips of his appeared as "Op/Art" in the op-ed pages of The New York Times.

Starting in 2003, Subitzky contributed 17 pieces (including essays, stories, cartoons, and comic strips) on the subject of consciousness to a serious science journal, the Journal of Consciousness Studies. He has had over 20 letters published in New Scientist magazine. And since 2015, Subitzky's drawing and writing has appeared in many issues of The American Bystander humor magazine.

In 2015, clips from an interview with Subitzky were used in the documentary film National Lampoon: Drunk Stoned Brilliant Dead, and his likeness was used in one of the Rick Meyerowitz cartoon posters for the film.

In the fall of 2023, a retrospective book of Subitzky's humor work was published by the New York Review Books, see Poor Helpless Comics!.

For many years, Subitzky worked a day job as an advertising copywriter.

== Early life ==
Subitzky was born in and grew up in Mount Vernon, New York, just outside of New York City. As a child, he read a wide variety of comic books and Mad magazine. He was greatly influenced by the work of Harvey Kurtzman and to a lesser extent that of Will Elder, both of whom he met briefly in Mount Vernon when he was about 12 years old.

He was educated at what is now Binghamton University, where he was a mathematics major who also took many philosophy courses.

A few years later, he moved into Manhattan, and took cartooning classes at the School of Visual Arts. The classes were taught by Bob Blechman and Charles Slackman.

== National Lampoon magazine ==
A great deal of Subitzky's work was published in National Lampoon magazine. His contributions primarily consisted of comic strips, cartoons, and humor writing.

His connection with National Lampoon magazine was first established in 1972, when contributing editor Michel Choquette visited the School of Visual Arts cartooning class which Subitzky attended. Choquette took a liking to Subitzky's work, and brought him over to the offices of National Lampoon.

Subitzky subsequently became a long-term contributing editor; one or more of his comic strips, cartoons, and written articles appeared in almost every issue of the magazine. In September 1974, he guest-edited the "Old Age" issue of the magazine. His name remained on the masthead of National Lampoon all through the 1970s, through the decline of the magazine in the 1980s, and almost up to the point of its eventual demise.

Shary Flenniken, in the biography on her official website, describes Subitzky as "hysterically funny and unassuming".

=== Comic strips ===
Subitzky's roughly 100 comic strips for the National Lampoon included “Saturday Night on Antarius! (The Planet with 12 Different Sexes)", “Two-way Comics!", "Eight Comics in One!”, and “Come Too Soon Comics!” Many of his comic strips ran to several pages, and featured numerous very small panels.

=== Written humor ===
His approximately 100 articles and written pieces for National Lampoon included “How I Spent My Summer” in the Self-Indulgence issue (December 1973, Vol. 1, No. 45) and "Stupidworld" in the Stupid issue (March 1974, Vol 1, No 48).

=== Fumetti ===
Two of the many fumetti, also known as photo funnies, that Subitzky wrote were "The Perfect Date" and "Every Red-Blooded American Boy's Dream: Three Pretty Girls Doing Just What You Want So You Can Masturbate!"

=== National Lampoon books ===
In 1974, Subitzky wrote two sections of the infamous National Lampoon 1964 High School Yearbook Parody: the first piece in the yearbook, which is the Principal's letter, and "In Memorium" [sic], which is a parody of a student In Memoriam piece.

Also in 1974, Subitzky wrote numerous sections of the National Lampoon book,The Job of Sex, which was a parody of The Joy of Sex.

His writing and cartooning were reprinted in many National Lampoon anthologies.

== Other anthologies ==
Pieces of his have been included in several other anthologies, including the 1990 Harper/Collins Big Book of New American Humor, and more than one cartoon collection edited by the cartoonist Sam Gross.

A comic drawn by Subitzky in 1972 piece entitled "Two-headed Sam in the Singles Bar!" was included in the large-format book The Someday Funnies, which was finally published in 2011. The book was a collection of creative commentary on the 1960s, the content having been collected and compiled by Michel Choquette during the 1970s. The Someday Funnies included pieces by William Burroughs, Federico Fellini, Tom Wolfe, Frank Zappa, and 165 others.

== Works for radio ==
=== National Lampoon radio ===
Subitzky was a writer for and an occasional performer on The National Lampoon Radio Hour, which ran for just over a year in 1973 to 1974. He conceptualized and wrote all, or nearly all, of the “Public Disservice Announcements” (which were parodies of public service announcements), as well as a number of other pieces. Some selections from the Radio Hour work appeared on the CD album Gold Turkey.

Subitzky also conceived, wrote, and starred in a one-hour, two-episode radio play broadcast on The National Lampoon Radio Hour in 1974. The play was entitled The Sluts from Space and it was a spoof of popular science-fiction/horror dramas. The two half-hour episodes aired on May 25 and June 2. Subitzky voiced the part of the science-nerd hero, Timmy Johnson, who by clever control of the supply of deodorants, manages to save the world from alien invaders disguised as beautiful and seductive women. The Sluts from Space episodes of the show are listed in detail at: and .

=== Horror stories ===
In 1980, Subitzky wrote numerous pieces for a nationally syndicated series of five-minute horror stories, which were broadcast on radio. The series was entitled The Nightwatch. Some of these stories were also made available on an album by Clack, Inc., called Ten Horror Stories: For Radio.

== National Lampoon comedy albums ==
Subitzky conceived and wrote two National Lampoon albums:

- Official National Lampoon Stereo Test and Demonstration Record, 1974, an LP record which was voiced by John Belushi and Chevy Chase, among others. Subitzky also wrote the extensive liner notes for the album.
- The Official National Lampoon Car Stereo Test & Demonstration Tape, 1980, which was on cassette tape, and was supposedly an audio test for car stereo.

== Television work with David Letterman ==
=== Comedy writing and performing ===
In 1980, Subitzky was hired as a comedy writer on The David Letterman Show (the morning show), where he helped create "The Imposter," a series of comedy sketches about a person who pretends to be celebrities in order to get on television. During the sketches, Letterman always completely accepts the fake identity that the Imposter has presented. Subitzky was soon asked to actually play the character of the Imposter, which he did four times on the morning show. He also reprised the role twelve more times on Late Night with David Letterman.

For the sketches, in most cases Subitzky wore his own clothes, and there was usually no attempt to make him look like the person he was purporting to be. However, when he was claiming to be James Clavell, Subitzky wore a tuxedo, and when pretending to be Don Henley, he was dressed in a leather motorcycle jacket and a black sequined teeshirt. When Subitzky was announced as being the viewer Elizabeth Callahan, he appeared in full drag and makeup, however, his real-life moustache was clearly visible. As Santa Claus, Subitzky wore a full Santa costume, beard and hair, and, as the U.S. Airforce Academy Choir, he wore a chorister's robe.

At the end of the first three sketches that were made, Subitzky left the stage via the same entrance that he came in at, i.e. via the wings, however by the 4th sketch and for all the subsequent sketches, Subitzky left the stage by walking up the aisle through the audience, apologizing profusely to audience members as he went along.

For the first three sketches, Subitzky had claimed to be just one celebrity, but by sketch number four he claimed to be two people simultaneously. Late in the series of sketches he claimed to be an entire choir of children.

==== On The David Letterman Show ====
- The following four Imposter sketches ran on episodes of the morning show, The David Letterman Show (which ran from June 23 to October 24, 1980):
- July 2, 1980: Ed Subitzky as the singer Donna Summer
- July 18, 1980: Ed Subitzky as the actor Gary Coleman
- July 24, 1980: Ed Subitzky as the actress Suzanne Somers
- August 5, 1980: Ed Subitzky as actor Burt Reynolds and actress Sally Field (who were a couple at the time)

The morning show was cancelled in October 1980, after only 18 weeks on the air. And it was not until early in 1982 that the first Letterman evening show, Late Night with David Letterman, started airing.

==== On Late Night with David Letterman ====
- The following twelve Imposter sketches ran on Late Night with David Letterman (a show which ran from February 1, 1982, to June 25, 1993):
- March 25, 1982: Ed Subitzky as Martin Cruz Smith, author of the novel Gorky Park
- April 22, 1982: Ed Subitzky as Don Henley of The Eagles
- June 4, 1982,: Ed Subitzky as James Clavell, author of Noble House
- June 30, 1982, Ed Subitzky as "The Mattress Thief"
- July 9, 1982: Ed Subitzky as Santa Claus
- July 29, 1982: Ed Subitzky as viewer Elizabeth Callahan of Champion, Pennsylvania
- October 4, 1982: Ed Subitzky ask the comedian Bob Hope
- December 20, 1982: Ed Subitzky as the U.S. Airforce Academy Choir
- December 21, 1982: Ed Subitzky as the Brooke Shields doll (a doll altered to look like Subitzky)
- February 4, 1983: Ed Subitzky, in what is claimed to be the First Anniversary edition of the show, is announced as being the singer Bruce Springsteen, who is arriving in a limousine as one of many celebrities who will be attending the anniversary party.
- February 4, 1983: Also in the same show (The First Anniversary edition) clips are shown of problems that Letterman says had to be edited out of some of the previous shows. Letterman explains that the following clip was an example of "audience rowdiness". Subitzky is shown as having been fatally shot through the chest with an arrow by an audience member.
- February 4, 1984: A year later it is the Second Anniversary of the show, which is cause for another party. During the closing sequence, Subitzky is visible (mostly from behind) as a guest at that party.

(When Letterman moved from NBC to CBS, the name of Letterman's show was changed to the Late Show with David Letterman, which ran from August 30, 1993, to May 20, 2015, when Letterman retired. However, Subitzky did not appear on that show.)

== Cartoons on The New York Times op-ed page ==
During the 1990s, Subitzky had seven cartoons published as "Op-Art" on the op-ed page of The New York Times. The titles of the pieces were:

- February 22, 1997: Too Many Lawyers
- June 27, 1997: The First signs of Global Warming in New York
- September 27, 1997: After Managed Care
- November 22, 1997: Sure-fire Ways to improve the I.R.S.
- February 16, 1998: Other Pedestrian Safety Measures
- August 15, 1998: Some More Ways to Improve Our Taxi Service
- October 9, 1998: Still More... Reasons for Impeachment and For Either Party... Safe Choices for 2000

== Cartoons and humor for magazines other than National Lampoon ==
Before National Lampoon started running Subitzky's work, back in 1968 and 1969 Subitzky had two cartoons published in Cavalier. In 1970, six of his cartoons were published in Scanlan's Monthly, and one cartoon of his was published in The Magazine, probably in 1971.

=== The New Yorker ===
Two of Subitzky's cartoons ran in The New Yorker. One was a cartoon which The New Yorker bought from Subitzky in 1974, in order to hand it over to Charles Addams, so Addams could draw it up as if it had been his own idea (apparently this kind of thing was not uncommon in Addams's later years). That cartoon was published in the August 12, 1974, issue of The New Yorker. It shows an invisible man begging, with a hand-drawn sign that says, "BE THANKFUL YOU CAN BE SEEN, GOD BLESS YOU.

The other cartoon of Subitzky's that was in The New Yorker was run normally under Subitzky's own name. That one, "Cinema East Schedule", ran in the August 26, 1974, issue.

=== Cartoons for other magazines ===
Subitzky's cartoons have appeared in several other magazines.

==== Tricycle: The Buddhist Review ====
In 1992 and 1993, eleven of his cartoons ran in Tricycle: The Buddhist Review as follows:

- Zen Connect-the-Dots
- Zen Vacuum Cleaner (no attachments)
- "My Mantra or Yours?"
- Zen Street Sign
- "So Mr. Smithers, when did you first discover that your sense of self was just an illusion?"
- "...and thus, as my last will and testament, I leave all of my belongings to myself in my next life."
- New Trends in Buddhist Hairstyles -- the impermanent
- Men Women Zen masters
- Which came first... The drawing of the egg, The drawing of the chicken, The pencil
- Zen Ski Tracks
- Large Impermanent Sand Mandala

==== Natural History ====
In 1993 and 1994, three of Subitzky's cartoons ran in Natural History:

- Linnaeus attempts to classify scientists, but decides that species would be easier
- The World's largest Venus flytrap species develops landing strip mimicry
- "Nice Camouflage!" "Thanks!"

=== Cracked ===
During the 1990s, five written humor pieces of Subitzky's appeared in Cracked:

- In 1994, "What if Comic Strips...Guest Stars"
- In 1996, "What Really Happens When...",
- "Dirty Jokes from other Galaxies", and
- "Miranda Rights for Everyday Living"
- In 1998, "Paper Airplane"

== Science-related work ==
Starting during the 1990s, Subitzky has created a number of science-related pieces for outlets other than National Lampoon.

=== Letters to New Scientist ===
Starting in 1997, but primarily since 2012, Subitzky has had over 20 letters, some humorous, and some serious, primarily about ideas in physics and cosmology, published in the international science magazine, New Scientist, and he has also had one letter published in Science News.

=== Journal of Irreproducible Results ===
In 1991, Subitzky co-wrote a science humor piece for the science humor magazine Journal of Irreproducible Results entitled, “A Call For More Scientific Truth in Product Warning Labels”, by Susan Hewitt and Edward Subitzky. This piece was subsequently quoted by both New Scientist and Atlantic Monthly. More than 20 years after the piece was first published, it was still featured (both with and without its title, attribution, and introduction) on hundreds of websites, including versions translated into Dutch, French, German , Hungarian, and Spanish.

== Philosophy-related work ==
Subitzky has had a life-long interest in both science and philosophy, and he is especially fascinated by the very challenging "hard problem" of consciousness, i.e. why there is a subjective component to experience. Because of these interests, in 2003, Subitzky started contributing to the Journal of Consciousness Studies (JCS), an interdisciplinary, peer-reviewed academic journal that is dedicated entirely to the field of consciousness studies. JCS is published by Imprint Academic, of Exeter, England.

=== Journal of Consciousness Studies ===
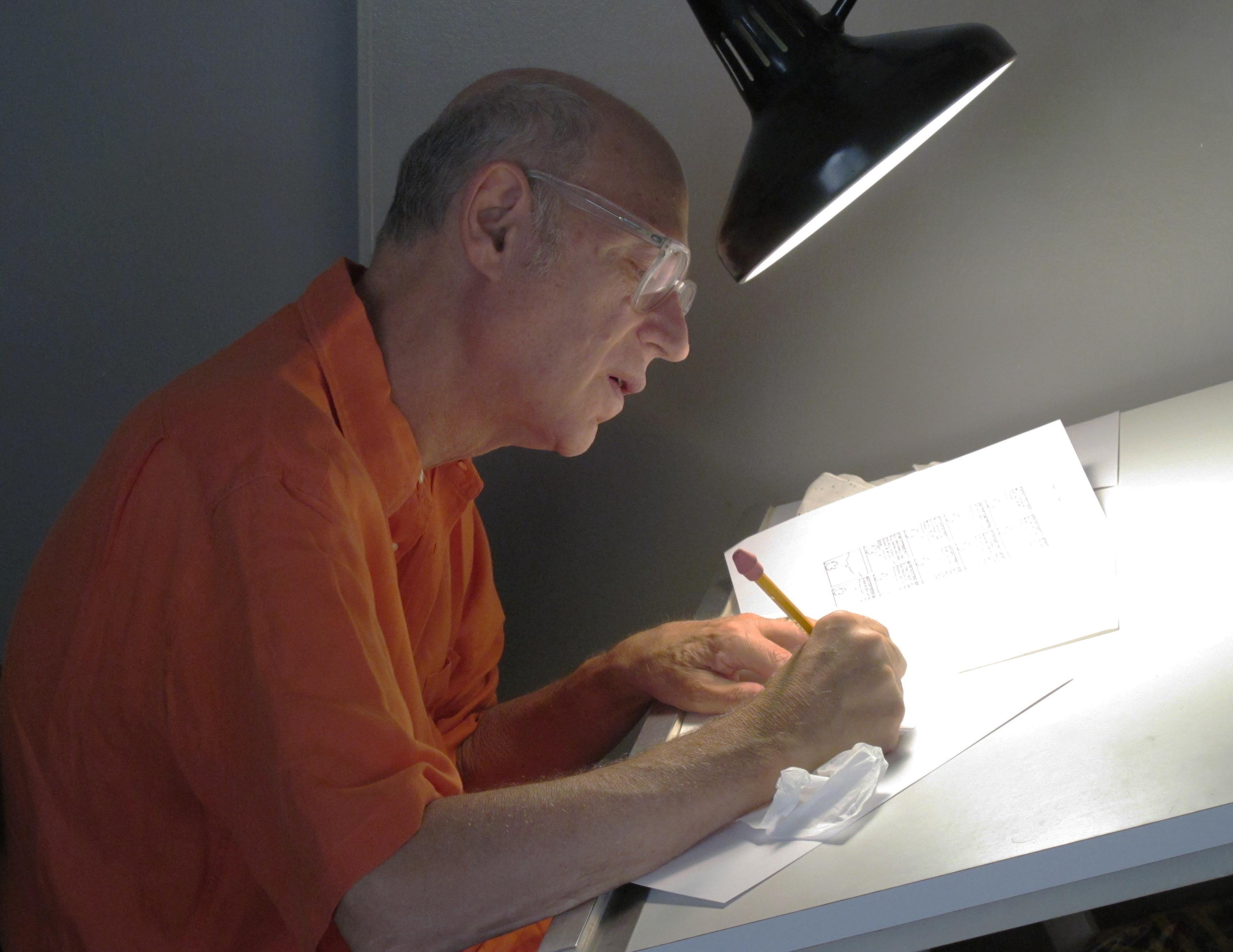
Subitzky at his drawing table in 2012, working on a JCS comic strip

From 2003 to 2016, Subitzky had nine drawn pieces and ten written pieces published in the Journal of Consciousness Studies. All the pieces made serious points, although some had a humorous perspective. The pieces included an essay, a visual essay, cartoons, comic strips, science-fiction short stories, a poem, and a fictional research paper. All of the pieces contain philosophical commentary on theories concerning the nature of consciousness.

In chronological order, Subitzky's JCS pieces were:

- 2003: * "I am a conscious essay", an essay, Volume 10, No. 12, December, pp. 64–66
- 2004: A single-panel untitled cartoon (man enclosed in his own thought balloon) was used as a frontispiece for the journal, Volume 11, No. 9, September, frontispiece
- 2005: In 2005, the same untitled cartoon about consciousness (man enclosed in his own thought balloon) was used as cover art for What does it all mean? A humanistic account of human experience by William A. Adams, 2005, 250 pages, published by Imprint Academic; "Inkland", a 4-page comic strip, Volume 12, No. 12, December, pp. 80–83
- 2006: "The Voyage", a science fiction short story, Volume 13 No. 9, October, pp. 87–89
- 2008: "The Experiment", another science fiction short story, Volume 15, No. 4, April, pp. 83–85
- 2009: "Mirage", a poem, Volume 15, No. 12, December
- 2010: A single-panel cartoon on the subject of the Turing test was used as the cover art for a double issue of JCS, and a more complete version was printed inside: Untitled cover art ("A man gives himself the Turing test ... and passes"), Volume 17, No. 1–2, January–February, cover and p. 228 , "Consciousness Puzzle Page" (part 1) cartoon page, Volume 17, No. 9-10, September–October, p. 229 , , "Consciousness Puzzle Page" (part 2) cartoon page, Volume 17, No. 11-12, November–December, p. 180
- 2011: "Consciousness Puzzle Page" (part 3) cartoon page, Volume 18, No. 3-4, March/April, p. 234
- 2012: "The Big Question", a single-panel cartoon, Volume 19, No. 3–4, March–April, p. 244, "A Man of Letters", a two-page comic strip, Volume 19, No. 9–10, September–October, pp. 237–238
- 2013: "Consciousness Puzzle Page" (part 4) cartoon page, Volume 20, No. 1–2, January–February, p. 226, "Report from the Future", an imaginary research paper entitled, "An examination of conscigenesis in an artificially created quantum mechanical universe: a physical perspective" by Kranz Tullen, Bvorn Ellin & Shan Tavid, Volume 20, No. 3–4, pp. 230–232, "Where am I?" a two-page visual essay, Volume 20, No. 9-10, September–October, pp. 206–207
- 2014: "Th-ink", a two-page comic strip, Volume 21, No. 5-6, June–July, pp. 218–219, Marooned, a three-page science fiction story, volume 21 No. 11-12, pp. 155–57
- 2016: "The Reader", a two page comic strip, Volume 23, No. 3–4, pp. 264–265, "Word Play", a two-page comic strip, Volume 23, No. 9–10, pp. 254–255

== Film-related work ==
Subitzky conceived, wrote, and did the original drawings for, a short animated film which was then produced, and subsequently bought by Saturday Night Live, but was not aired. He co-wrote a screenplay, which was bought but not produced. He also wrote the lyrics for a country song which appeared as background music in a bar scene in another film (Kandyland, 1987).

== Character modeling and acting in a commercial ==
Subitzky appeared in National Lampoon magazine as a character model in editorial photographs 54 times. In 1977, he appeared on the cover of the book National Lampoon The Gentleman's Bathroom Companion as the Ty-D-Bol man (a spoof of commercials for a blue-tinted toilet bowl cleaner).

In the 1980s, Subitzky was the sole actor in a television commercial for a video game called Mountain King.

In 1988, he was featured on the cover of the March–April issue of National Lampoon magazine, as a disappointed television viewer .

During the 1990s, Subitzky occasionally worked for the modeling agency FunnyFace Today, appearing in editorial images in a few publications, including Redbook.

== 2006 parody in POX ==
In 2006, an Australian magazine, POX, ran a multipage National Lampoon magazine parody, which included a take-off of Subitzky's comic strips.

== 2010 book Drunk Stoned Brilliant Dead ==
A chapter about Subitzky (pages 208 – 213) forms part of the 2010 coffee-table book about the early years of National Lampoon magazine, Drunk Stoned Brilliant Dead: The Writers and Artists Who Made the National Lampoon Insanely Great by Rick Meyerowitz.

== 2011 book The Someday Funnies ==
A one-page comic strip by Subitzky is included in the book The Someday Funnies, a collection of original comics about the 1960s, edited by Michel Choquette. It was released by Abrams on November 1, 2011. Other contributors included the writer William Burroughs, the filmmaker Federico Fellini, the writer Tom Wolfe, and the musician Frank Zappa.

== 2011 Lynda Barry book Blabber, Blabber, Blabber ==
On page 13 of her 2011 book, Blabber, Blabber, Blabber: Volume 1 of Everything, American cartoonist Lynda Barry lists Subitzky as one of her early influences:

"By the time I graduated from high school I knew about bitter and sweet, but thanks to cartoonists like M.K. Brown, Gahan Wilson, and Ed Subitzky, I also knew about weird and rare and hilarious ways of changing one into the other. These three cartoonists taught me to watch the people around me and listen to how they talk and to write down what they say. But I learned the most by copying their drawings, and these three were especially good teachers." And on page 114 of the same book, Barry says, "...the first drawings I copied would leave traces in my work and drawing style that were unshakable and strong."

== 2013 anthology Black Eye 2 ==
A one-page comic strip by Subitzky was featured on page 18 of Black Eye 2, a limited-edition anthology of black humor.

== 2013 book That's Not Funny, That's Sick ==
In June 2013, That's Not Funny, That's Sick: The National Lampoon and the Comedy Insurgents Who Captured the Mainstream, by Ellin Stein was published. Subitzky is mentioned on pages 172 and 174 of that book.

== 2015 documentary film Drunk Stoned Brilliant Dead ==
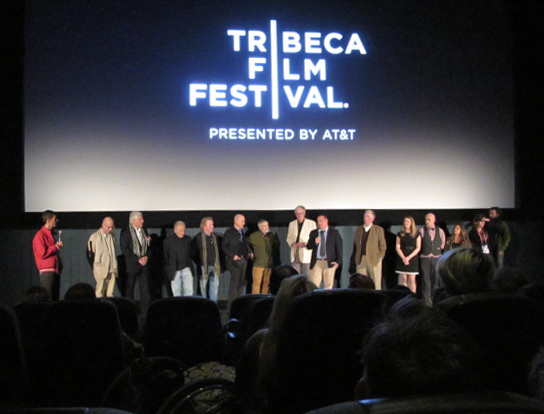
On stage at the April 2015 Tribeca Film Festival where the documentary film "National Lampoon: Drunk Stoned Brilliant Dead" was shown, Subitzky is the second on the left, in beige.

In 2015, a documentary film entitled National Lampoon: Drunk Stoned Brilliant Dead was released. The film is about how National Lampoon and its contributors changed American humor. The film features clips from interviews with many of the magazine's major artists and writers, including Subitzky.

== Work for The American Bystander ==
Since 2015, Subitzky's drawing and writing has appeared in several issues of The American Bystander, a magazine which is edited and published by Michael Gerber, and the head writer of which is Brian McConnachie.

Comic Strips:

- Murder at the Mansion
- Man talking to the reader
- Agony Comics
- One day in the park
- In The Skyscraper
- The entire internet on a page
- What they're thinking
- Hi Brian!

Written pieces:

- Comic Character Cursing Dictionary
- The World's Longest Joke
- Fred's Day

== 2023, retrospective book, Poor Helpless Comics! ==
In 2022, Subitzky was approached by New York Review Comics, the comics imprint of New York Review of Books (NYRB) (nybooks.com is the website of the company that publishes the New York Review of Books magazine). NYRB was interested in creating a retrospective volume of Subitzky's humor work. The idea of a book about Subitzky's work was suggested to NYRB by the underground cartoonist Mark Newgarden, who had been a fan of Subitzky's for many years, and who ended up creating an interview with Subitzky which became an essential part of the book.

The book is entitled, Poor Helpless Comics!: The Cartoons (and More) of Ed Subitzky. It is 184 pages long, paperback, and 9 x 12 inches in size, deliberately similar to the physical format of National Lampoon (Magazine). The book was released on October 10, 2023.
