= Drunk Stoned Brilliant Dead (book) =

2010 book by Rick Meyerowitz

- Author: Rick Meyerowitz
- Language: English
- Publisher: Harry N. Abrams
- Publication date: September 1, 2010
- Publication place: United States
- Media type: Print
- Pages: 320
- ISBN: 978-0-8109-8848-4

Drunk Stoned Brilliant Dead: The Writers and Artists Who Made National Lampoon Insanely Great by Rick Meyerowitz, is a 2010 book which was published by Harry N. Abrams of New York. The book consists of a compilation of work by a selection of writers and artists whose work appeared in National Lampoon magazine in the 1970s, as well as introductory commentary on those people and their work, by Meyerowitz and others. The book is hardback, coffee-table sized and is profusely illustrated.

A very similar title was used for the 2015 documentary film National Lampoon: Drunk Stoned Brilliant Dead, for which Rick Meyerowitz designed the poster, as he also did for the 1978 film National Lampoon's Animal House.

== Writers and artists included ==
The book covers the work of the following people. The content of the book is as follows:

- The Founders: Doug Kenney, Henry Beard
- Present at the Birth: Michael O'Donoghue, George William Swift Trow, Christopher Cerf, John Weidman, Rick Meyerowitz, Michel Choquette
- The Cohort: Arnold Roth, Tony Hendra, Sam Gross, Sean Kelly, Anne Beatts, Charles Rodrigues
- The First Wave: Brian McConnachie, Chris Miller, Gerald Sussman, Ed Subitzky, P.J. O'Rourke, Bruce McCall, Stan Mack
- The Second Coming: M.K. Brown, Ted Mann, Shary Flenniken, Danny Abelson & Ellis Weiner, Wayne McLoughlin
- The End of the Beginning: Ron Barrett, Jeff Greenfield, Ron Hauge, Fred Graver
- The Art Directors: Cloud Studios, Michael C. Gross and David Kaestle, Peter Kleinman, Skip Johnson
