= Bob Pomann =

American sound designer and producer

- Born: Robert Pomann
- Occupation: Sound designer producer
- Years active: 1976–present

Bob Pomann is an American sound designer and producer whose work has been used in films, and in animated television series, including Doug and Little Einsteins. Pomann has also produced thousands of radio and television commercials, including award-winning ones.

== Early life ==
While still in high school, Pomann was handpicked for an internship at Wendell L. Craig Inc. Thrust into doing promotional radio for film for Paramount, United Artists, and MGM, eighteen-year-old Bob turned out CLIO-nominated radio spots for the films King Kong in 1976 and For Your Eyes Only in 1981.

From there Pomann began doing sound effects for the original Saturday Night Live shorts with the legendary original cast, which included Dan Aykroyd, John Belushi, Chevy Chase, Jane Curtin, Garrett Morris, Laraine Newman, Michael O'Donoghue, and Gilda Radner. Pomann's Saturday Night Live work in turn led to his working on Michael O'Donoghue’s NBC television special, Mr. Mike's Mondo Video.

In 1980, Pomann was the sound designer for the National Lampoon comedy album, The Official National Lampoon Car Stereo Test & Demonstration Tape, working closely with the writer of the material, Ed Subitzky.

== 1982 onward ==
In 1982, after a year at "JC Productions" doing radio and TV advertising, Pomann opened his private company "Pomann Sound", a full-service audio-post and sound design house. Pomann Sound has three suites for audio record and mix.

Pomann went on to design sound for Disney’s long-form animated series, Doug. Pomann's specialized sound can be heard on series including Little Einsteins, Kids Next Door for over 800 animated episodes.

In addition, Pomann sound designed No Love in the City the Russian romantic comedy that was released in 2009, and became one of Russia’s largest grossing films to date.

Pomann has worked with the advertising agencies Ogilvy & Mather, McCann, and Chiat/Day, for products including Subway, Nicorette and Verizon Fios.

Pomann Sound was a 2010 Gold Winner in the Cannes Lions International Advertising Festival and The One Show - Dos Equis radio, Euro RSCG, for the radio advertising campaign, "The Most Interesting Man in the World".

== Filmography ==
The following is a filmography for Bob Pomann.

=== Film ===
- Excuse Me for Living (2012), Role: Sound Designer
- Space Chimps (2008), Role: Sound Recordist

=== Television ===
- Moving Up (2009), Role: Audio Mixer
- Davey and Goliath's Snowboard Christmas (2005), Role: Audio Mixer
- Little Bill (2004), Role: Sound, Sound Mixer
- Disney's Doug (2001), Role: Sound Designer
- PB&J Otter (2001), Role: Sound Designer
- Doug (1998), Role: Sound, Sound Mixer
- Doug's Secret Christmas (1997), Role: Sound Designer
