= The American Bystander =

Quarterly humor magazine

The American Bystander is a quarterly humor magazine in trade paperback book format. Edited and published by Michael Gerber, it features contributions from many notable comedy writers, illustrators and cartoonists. The Bystander is designed to provide a classic print humor magazine experience similar to that delivered by National Lampoon, SPY, Harold Hayes-era Esquire and many others in the pre-internet era. Yet according to The New York Times, The American Bystander "does not just belong to the tradition of defunct magazines like The National Lampoon and Spy. Its nostalgic, lightly witty style evokes influences that have been dead even longer, like the raconteur Jean Shepherd and the sophisticated stylist Robert Benchley."

The Bystander emerged after several years of planning by Gerber, head writer Brian McConnachie, and Alan Goldberg. Issue #1 was successfully funded on Kickstarter on November 13, 2015. This 146-page softcover book featured work by Jack Handey, George Meyer, Roz Chast, Terry Jones, and many others. Issue #2 successfully funded April 21, 2016, with material from even more contributors than the first, including Merrill Markoe, Simon Rich, Todd Hanson, Nell Scovell and a cover by Charles Barsotti. After the first two issues received a positive review in The New York Times in July 2016, issue #3 appeared in November 2016. Since then, issues of The Bystander have been produced on a roughly quarterly basis, increasing to bimonthly in 2019. The staff continues to increase: to date, nearly 400 writers and artists have contributed to the magazine. Issues are available via a permanent crowdfunding campaign via Patreon, as well as conventional bookstore channels; this allows the magazine to employ a "thousand true fans" model. It reached break-even in April 2019, a signal achievement for an independent, reader-funded magazine. After a hiatus from 2023-2024, the magazine resumed publishing a print edition in March 2025. In 2024, the magazine changed to nonprofit status.

In an era of lightning-fast comedy shared over social media, "The editors of Bystander think of the quarterly as the comedy equivalent of 'slow food.'"

== Publishing model ==
The American Bystander uses an innovative reader-focused publishing model. This was developed by Gerber in response to the longstanding commercial/distribution problems specific to print humor magazines, which had kept the United States without a national "slick" humor magazine since the demise of National Lampoon and SPY in 1998.

Though it does promote projects by contributors (for example, books by Mimi Pond, Dave Hill or Daniel M. Lavery), The American Bystander does not currently run paid advertising. Instead, it uses social media and crowdfunding platforms like Kickstarter and Indiegogo to gather readers willing to pay a price which reflects the actual printing and shipping costs of each issue. This grass-roots model allowed The Bystander to launch without the backing of a large corporation or wealthy individual, while still achieving a high-quality product and paying its contributors.

On an ongoing basis, Bystander's reader-focused model prevents publishing-side encroachment on editorial, as happened at National Lampoon after the 1975 buyout of Henry Beard, Doug Kenney, and Rob Hoffman; the necessity of courting a national audience to satisfy advertisers (as with late-period SPY); or the unpredictable actions of a financial patron as was suffered by Harvey Kurtzman's ill-fated Trump.

== 1982 pilot issue ==
In the early 1980s, writer/editor Brian McConnachie conceived a large-format (11 x 15 in.) bimonthly magazine he hoped would occupy the space between The National Lampoon and The New Yorker. Calling on friends and colleagues from SCTV and Saturday Night Live, McConnachie received backing from Dan Aykroyd, John Belushi, Brian Doyle-Murray, Lorne Michaels, Bill Murray, Gilda Radner, G.E. Smith, Harold Ramis, Dave Thomas, and Jack Ziegler. This allowed McConnachie and Managing Editor Jennifer Finney Boylan to produce a 32-page pilot issue for prospective backers, featuring material from John Caldwell, Sam Gross, Jeff Jones, M.K. Brown, David Boswell, Charles Burns, Garry Winogrand, Mike Wilkins, Doug Kirby, and others.

In a letter introducing the issue, McConnachie said that The American Bystander would tap "one of our greatest resources—the inventiveness, the style and the independence of the American character. And that of several Canadians as well. Just a few, not enough to affect the title." Unfortunately, despite an appearance on the then-new Late Night with David Letterman to promote the project, luck was not with McConnachie, and this early version of The American Bystander never went into production, instead remaining one of the great what-ifs of that generation of comedy.

In 2012, McConnachie and Alan Goldberg approached their friend Gerber, and asked him to apply humor-specific publishing/editing models he'd learned self-publishing Barry Trotter and the Shameless Parody and resurrecting The Yale Record to make a new and improved Bystander which combined the sensibility of the '82 attempt with the publishing realities of the post-Internet age. Gerber referred to the 1982 edition extensively while creating the editorial structure of the 2015 magazine. This backstory was first revealed in Boylan's column in The New York Times.

== Contributors ==
The following is a partial list of the writers and artists featured in The American Bystander:

- Ron Barrett
- Charles Barsotti
- Kate Beaton
- Louisa Bertman
- Michael Ian Black
- R.O. Blechman
- George Booth
- Eric Branscum
- Steve Brodner
- M.K. Brown
- John Caldwell
- Roz Chast
- Seymour Chwast
- Howard Cruse
- Liza Donnelly
- Drew Friedman
- Emily Flake
- Shary Flenniken
- Bill Franzen
- Daniel Galef
- Rick Geary
- Michael Gerber
- Robert Grossman
- Jack Handey
- Todd Hanson
- Ron Hauge
- Al Jean
- Terry Jones
- Farley Katz
- Sean Kelly
- Ken Krimstein
- Peter Kuper
- Navied Mahdavian
- Brian McConnachie
- Merrill Markoe
- Sam Means
- George Meyer
- Rick Meyerowitz
- Michael O'Donoghue
- Mark O'Donnell
- Daniel M. Lavery
- Matt Percival
- K. A. Polzin
- Mimi Pond
- Mike Reiss
- Simon Rich
- Arnold Roth
- Mike Sacks
- Edward Sorel
- Frank Springer
- Ed Subitzky
- Dirk Voetberg
- Julia Wertz
- Ellis Weiner
- Steve Young
- Mike Shiell

== External links and reviews ==
- New York Times review by Jason Zinoman
- Nieman Lab article by Joseph Lichterman
- Comicsbeat review
- Newsweek review
- The American Bystander's website
- the laugh button review
