= The 80s: A Look Back at the Tumultuous Decade 1980–1989 =

- Author: Tony Hendra, Christopher Cerf and Peter Elbling (editors)
- Language: English
- Genre: Humor
- Publisher: Workman Publishing Company
- Publication date: October 1979
- Publication place: United States
- Media type: Paperback
- Pages: 264
- ISBN: 978-0-89480-119-8
- OCLC: 5289351
- Followed by: The 90s: A Look Back

The 80s: A Look Back at the Tumultuous Decade 1980–1989 is a humor book published in 1979.

It was edited by Tony Hendra, Christopher Cerf and Peter Elbling, with art direction by Michael Gross. Contributors to the book included Henry Beard, Valerie Curtin, Amy Ephron, Jeff Greenfield, Abbie Hoffman, Sean Kelly, B. Kliban, Paul Krassner, David Lander, Stan Lee, Stan Mack, Bruce McCall, Rick Meyerowitz, Maurice Peterson, George Plimpton and Harry Shearer.

The premise of the book was that it was a satirical review of American events in the 1980s. Having been written in 1979, the events were of course fictional and most of the satire was actually directed towards the late 1970s. Some of the events from the book included:

- Ted Kennedy's election to the Presidency in 1980, followed ten days thereafter by his resignation due to a botched surgical operation by Surgeon General Allan Bakke.
- The 1981 Disney Corporation purchase of the United Kingdom, which was remodeled into a theme park, the United Magic Kingdom.
- The United Nations declaration of 1983 as the International Year of the Simultaneous Orgasm.
- The illegalization of meat in 1983, leading to an underground "meathead" culture.
- The collapse of NBC in 1983 and CBS in 1984, leaving ABC as America's sole television network.
- The collapse of the New York Stock Exchange in 1984.
- Muhammad Ali being named as the Chairman of the Joint Chiefs of Staff and leader of an all-black Army in 1985.
- Economic upheaval caused by a global oil glut in 1986.
- The declaration of broccoli to be an endangered vegetable in 1988.
- France being destroyed by the misdirected microwave beam of an orbital power station.
- The 1988 World's Fair held in Tirana, Albania.
- An Arabic invasion of Europe in 1989.

The book was a best-seller and a sequel, The 90s: A Look Back, was published with a similar premise in 1989. The second book did not have the same success as the first.
