= National Lampoon White Album =

Studio album by National Lampoon
- Released: 1980
- Genre: Comedy and spoken word
- Language: English
- Label: National Lampoon

National Lampoon chronology
Greatest Hits of the National Lampoon	National Lampoon White Album	Official National Lampoon Car Stereo Test and Demonstration Tape

Professional ratings
Review scores
Source	Rating
AllMusic	2/5 stars

National Lampoon White Album is an American album of humorous songs and spoken word skits. It was originally released as a vinyl record and cassette tape in 1980, but it was reissued and is still available as a CD. It was written and performed by people associated with National Lampoon magazine and its related productions.

Most of the tracks were by comedians who were not very well known, but the track "Hollywood Gay Alliance" (which originally aired on The National Lampoon Radio Hour in 1974) featured John Belushi, Chevy Chase, and Christopher Guest.

The cover features a recording studio filled with Ku Klux Klan members performing and recording.

== Track listing ==
1. Perrier Junkie
2. At the Bar
3. What is God?
4. Fartman
5. Discoleptic
6. Steak
7. The Sounds of Physical Love
8. Hollywood Gay Alliance
9. Robert Caucasian vs. Squab
10. What about Reupholsterers?
11. Shakespeare Knock Knocks
12. Nude Figure Model
13. Couple at the Door
14. Christopher Street
15. California Hot Tub
16. What Turns Women On
17. What Were You Expecting - Rock and Roll?

== Musical personnel ==
- Tony Scheuren — vocals, guitar
- Michael Simmons, Rhonda Coullet, Rory Dodd — vocals
- Don Sarlin, Steve Burgh — guitar
- Harvey Shapiro — steel guitar
- Curtis Fields — saxophone
- Paul Jacobs, Bruce Foster — keyboards
- Barry Lazarowitz, Michael Finkelstein, Yogi Horton — drums
