= Zany =

Zany may refer to:

- DJ Zany (born 1974), disc jockey
- Bob Zany (born 1961), American stand-up comedian

== Other uses ==
- A Goofball term, like whacky.

== See also ==
- Zany Brainy, an educational toy store
- Zany Golf, a video game
- Zany Afternoons, a collection of illustrations by Bruce McCall
- Zany Fruits, a breakfast cereal; See List of breakfast cereals
- Zanni, term from which "zany" is derived
