= National Lampoon The Gentleman's Bathroom Companion =

1975 humorous book

- Language: English
- Publisher: National Lampoon
- Publication date: 1975
- Publication place: United States
- Media type: Print

National Lampoon The Gentleman's Bathroom Companion was a humorous book that was first published in 1975. It was a "special edition" of National Lampoon magazine, and as such it was sold on newsstands in addition to that month's regular issue of the magazine. The pieces in the book were created by regular contributors to the National Lampoon including Michael O'Donoghue, Henry Beard, Doug Kenney, Sean Kelly, Tony Hendra, P.J. O'Rourke and Ed Subitzky as well as Terry Southern and William Burroughs. The content was mostly, but not entirely, compiled from material that had already been published in the magazine.

The book cover art is a photograph which parodies a series of 1970s TV commercials advertising a blue toilet bowl cleanser in which a tiny man (known as the Ty-D-Bol man), wearing a neat nautical outfit and a yachting cap, was seen motoring around the inside of a toilet cistern in a tiny boat, always by himself. On the book cover parody, the Ty-D-Bol man is playing the ukulele and has a beautiful female companion in a bikini, however, the cistern is about to be flushed. The Ty-D-Bol man was played by Ed Subitzky.

A description (or possibly a subtitle) on the cover reads:

Being a Miscellany of Divers Ribald Drolleries Culled from the Pages of the National Lampoon, to which are appended Sundry Amusing Sketches by Mr. Sam Gross, Esq., and the Latest Novella by Mr. Chris Miller, B.A.

== See also ==
- National Lampoon Gentleman's Bathroom Companion II
