= The Official National Lampoon Car Stereo Test & Demonstration Tape =

Official National Lampoon Car Stereo Test and Demonstration Tape

Studio album by Ed Subitzky
- Released: 1980
- Genre: Comedy, demonstration
- Language: English
- Label: National Lampoon
- Director: Maurice Peterson
- Producer: Windy Craig

Ed Subitzky chronology
National Lampoon White Album	''Official National Lampoon Car Stereo Test and Demonstration Tape''	Sex, Drugs, Rock 'N' Roll & the End of the World

The Official National Lampoon Car Stereo Test & Demonstration Tape is a comedy album in cassette tape format which was put out by National Lampoon magazine in 1980. The album was a follow-up to the Official National Lampoon Stereo Test and Demonstration Record, which was released in 1974. The tape is however a completely different album consisting of entirely new material.

The album was conceived and written by National Lampoon contributing editor Ed Subitzky. The designer and writer for the wrapper (which was a spoof of consumer advertising) was Tibor Kalman, at M& co studio, and the sound designer for the album itself was Bob Pomann. The album was directed by Maurice Peterson, who also cast the album, and voice-acted several parts: a person with whiplash, a truck driver and a hobo.

The cassette is the main item in the Official National Lampoon Stereo Test & Demonstration Kit, which also includes a faux leather "travel case", cotton swabs, and a small bottle of cleaner fluid (for cleaning the heads on a cassette deck).

The album is a parody of stereo test and demonstration records, which were used by hi-fi enthusiasts to test the performance of their audio systems. All of the items recorded on the tape are comedy sketches; the majority of them are also functional car stereo tests. One sketch is an old-fashioned country music song of love lost, where the lyrics use tones that vary from 30 cycles per second (now known as the hertz) up to 15,000 cycles per second. Another sketch explains to the consumer how to play a trick on passengers in the car by using the left and right, as well as front and back, speaker volume controls to make it appear that fart noises are emanating from one particular area inside the car. Other comedy sketches help determine if a unit is in phase or out of phase, and whether a system has good left-right separation. The effects of interference noise and poor reception on car stereos are also demonstrated in comic ways.

An advertisement for the Official National Lampoon Car Stereo Test and Demonstration Tape ran in the July 1980 issue of National Lampoon magazine.
