= Matt Percival =

British cartoonist

- Areas: Cartoonist, Writer, Artist

Matt Percival is a British cartoonist known primarily for his single panel gag cartoons.

== Biography ==
Percival's first gag cartoon appeared in Private Eye. Between 1999 and 2000, he was a regular contributor for King Features' US syndicated daily comic strip panel The New Breed.

His work has been published in various British and American publications including Private Eye, The Spectator, New Statesman, Air Mail, Wall Street Journal, Prospect, The Oldie, The American Bystander, Harvard Business Review ,The Times and Punch. He signs his work 'PERCIVAL'. Some of his drawings can be viewed on the British Cartoon Archive.

As a comedy writer, he contributed material performed at the NewsRevue 2012 Edinburgh Festival Fringe show.

== Bibliography ==
=== Books ===
cartoons published in:

- Private Eye Annual 2025 ISBN 978-1901784756
- Private Eye Annual 2024 ISBN 978-1901784749
- The Politics of Street Trees 2022 ISBN 978-0367516284
- The Penguin Book of Brexit Cartoons 2018 ISBN 978-0-141-99008-8
- Private Eye Annual 2018 ISBN 978-1901784664
- Blockchain is WTF (Waarschijnlijk Toch Fundamenteel)? 2017 ISBN 978-9048631438
- Private Equity Laid Bare 2017 ISBN 978-1973918929
- Private Eye Annual 2015 ISBN 978-1901784633
- Draw The Line Here 2015 ISBN 978-0-9931705-3-9
- Private Equity 4.0 2015 ISBN 978-1-118-93973-4
- Private Eye A Cartoon History 2013 ISBN 978-1-901784-61-9
- Private Eye Annual 2012 ISBN 1-901784-57-6
- Private Eye Annual 1998 ISBN 1-901784-12-6

== Exhibitions ==
- 'NOT the RA Summer Exhibition' - Chris Beetles Gallery, London 2016
- '1984' - The Kowalsky Gallery, London 2009
