= Rhonda Coullet =

American singer-songwriter

- Born: Rhonda Lee Oglesby; September 23, 1945 (age 81); Magnolia, Arkansas, U.S.
- Genre: Rock
- Occupations: Singer-songwriter; actress; comedian; theatre composer; playwright

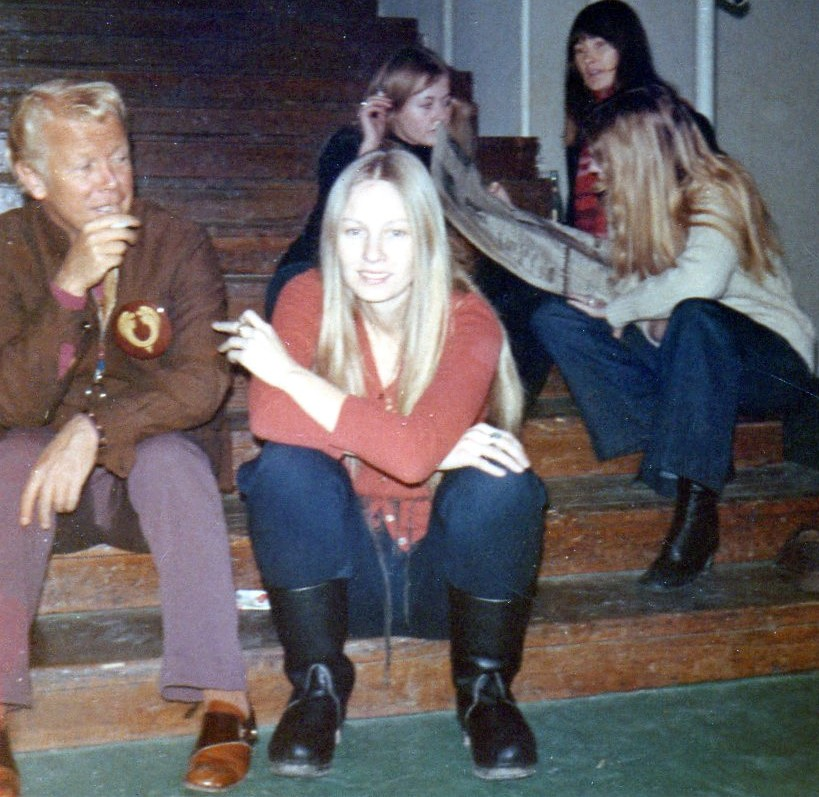
Rhonda Coullet in Gothenburg 1972

Rhonda Lee Oglesby Coullet (born September 23, 1945) is an American actress, comedian, singer-songwriter, theatre composer and playwright.

== Life and career ==
Oglesby was born in 1945 in Magnolia, Arkansas, the daughter of Horace and Cecil Oglesby. She was raised in Springhill, Louisiana before her family moved to Pine Bluff, where she attended Sam Taylor Elementary School and Pine Bluff High School. A singer, she received a music scholarship to attend the University of Arkansas.

She represented the University of Arkansas in the 1965 Miss Arkansas competition, which she won. After three months, she announced she was relinquishing the crown to pursue a show business career in Los Angeles.

In Los Angeles, she was in the original cast of the Aquarius Theatre's production of Hair. She was promoted to the lead female role of Jeanie, and went on to restage the musical in Seattle, Detroit, Miami, Montreal, Copenhagen, and touring productions in Europe.

On her return, she settled in New York City. She joined the cast of the 1973 Off Broadway show National Lampoon Lemmings, performing in various roles alongside such comedic actors as John Belushi, Chevy Chase and Christopher Guest. After touring with the show, she took part in The National Lampoon Radio Hour, which included Belushi, Chase, Guest, Bill Murray, Gilda Radner and Harold Ramis. She appeared on such albums as National Lampoon Missing White House Tapes and National Lampoon That's Not Funny, That's Sick.

Many of her fellow National Lampoon cast members went on to join Saturday Night Live. Coullet was a close friend of John Belushi, and after his death she composed and sang a tribute to him, "West Heaven," for a taped segment on SNL produced by Belushi's widow Judith Jacklin.

In 1976–77, Coullet starred in the Broadway production of the musical The Robber Bridegroom, playing the role of Rosamund, and can be heard on the original Broadway album with Barry Bostwick. She also starred on Broadway in Pump Boys and Dinettes and in the off-Broadway production of Cowgirls.

Coullet wrote "Bigger Than the Both of Us" for Jimmy Buffett on his Riddles in the Sand album, which was nominated for a Grammy Award in 1985. She was a back-up singer for Buffett, Spinal Tap, and Meat Loaf on his Dead Ringer album.

In 1992, she recorded an album of her own songs, titled The American Secret. Several of the semiautobiographical songs from the album were incorporated into her theatrical musical production, Runaway Beauty Queen, produced at Florida Studio Theatre in 2005 and The Vineyard Playhouse in 2010.

She was married to musician Armand Coullet from 1970 to 1980. Her brother Scott Oglesby is a published essayist and novelist.
