= Poor Helpless Comics! =

- Cover artist: Ed Subitzky
- Language: English
- Publisher: New York Review Comics, New York Review Books
- Publication date: October 10th, 2023
- Publication place: United States
- Media type: Print
- Pages: 174
- ISBN: 978-1-68137-787-2

Poor Helpless Comics!: The Cartoons (and More) of Ed Subitzky is a retrospective book of the humor work of cartoonist and writer Ed Subitzky. The book is published by the New York Review Books imprint New York Review Comics and was released on October 10, 2023. The blurbs on the back cover were written by cartoonists Lynda Barry and Roz Chast and comedy writer and producer Mike Reiss of The Simpsons.

The book showcases much of Subitzky's varied body of work for National Lampoon (magazine) as well as for numerous other publications including The New York Times. The book also covers Subitzky's appearances on live TV, both for the David Letterman Show and also for Late Night with David Letterman. The book is structured around a recent interview with Subitzky that was carried out by the underground cartoonist Mark Newgarden.

== The publisher's descriptions ==
The publisher's description of the book reads:

- The first-ever collection of comics by Ed Subitzky — comedy writer, National Lampoon legend, Atari spokesperson, “The Impostor” on The David Letterman Show, and an enduring influence on an entire generation of cartoonists and humorists.
- A cartoon that hypnotizes you. A cartoon that goes through puberty. A cartoon that covers the history of the universe in a few dozen panels. A cartoon that is a crossword puzzle.
- For the entire run of National Lampoon, Ed Subitzky bent, broke, and reimagined what a cartoon could do, creating some of the funniest and most lasting work of the era.
- In this first-ever collection of his work, Subitzky's range as a cartoonist and humorist is on full display, including not just his cartoons and his writing, but also glimpses of his work in television and advertising: collaborating on a comedy album with John Belushi, appearing as “The Imposter” on The David Letterman Show, and acting as a spokesperson for an Atari video game. In these pages, Subitzky can finally be seen for what he is: a cartoonist who makes you laugh.
