= National Lampoon Gentleman's Bathroom Companion II =

1977 book

- Language: English
- Publisher: National Lampoon
- Publication date: 1977
- Publication place: United States
- Media type: Print

National Lampoon Gentleman's Bathroom Companion II was a humorous book that was first published in 1977. It was a spin-off from National Lampoon magazine and a follow-up to the National Lampoon The Gentleman's Bathroom Companion. The pieces in the book were created by the National Lampoon's regular contributors.

A description (or possibly a subtitle) on the cover reads:

A Miscellany, Risque, of Choice Selections from the Bounteous Ribaldry of the Monthly National Lampoon. Prominently Displayed are the Works of Mr. Chris Miller, Mr. Sam Gross and Mr. Douglas Kenney.

The cover involves a woman in a suit kneeling holding a toilet paper roll like a dispenser as if she is the "Gentlemen's Bathroom Companion".
