= The Times Square Two =

American two-man entertainment act

The Times Square Two was a two-man act of music, comedy, acting and juggling.

Their performance of "I've Got a Funny Feeling for Ophelia" on the summer TV series Dean Martin Presents, starring The Golddiggers, Joey Heatherton, and Frank Sinatra, Jr., is part of the collection of the Museum of TV & Radio in New York and The Paley Center in Beverly Hills.

== The beginning ==
In early 1964, Michel Choquette, a singer-guitarist-performer from Canada, found himself stranded in Vancouver, when the owner of the coffeehouse he was to play there went bust. Among the other performers in town was Peter Elbling, a 20-year-old British folk singer who Choquette had met in Calgary several months previously. Their mutual interest in 1920s music and vaudeville and music-hall led to the creation of a comic musical act called The Times Square Two. Elbling became "Mycroft Partner" and Choquette "Andrew i." (This allowed them, if asked their names, to reply, "My Partner and i." "Mycroft" sported a goatee, claimed to have been born of a Malayan princess on a rubber plantation and radiated a dominant, pompous Oliver Hardy persona. "Andrew," who affected slicked-flat hair, large rimless glasses and a nasal, high-pitched voice (in which he asserted he had once hoped to play football for Notre Dame), became his flightier, subservient Stan Laurel. (They told interviewers they had met while sitting out an avalanche in an Alpine hut with a goatherd and some lusty peasant girls.) They created an imaginary world of entertainment that hovered between 1880 and 1930. They came to inhabit this world in dress, conversation and manner so completely whether on stage or off, that they acquired a liveried chauffeur, who drove them about in a 1930 Model A.

Their act opened with both men dressed in 1920s blue pinstriped suits sitting on straight-back chairs, staring fixedly ahead while holding guitars parallel to the ground. They would begin a song like "Just a Gigolo" or "I Wish I Could Shimmy Like My Sister Kate," rise like syncopated toys, and kick like demented Rockettes. They would juggle fruit, read minds, perform acrobatics, hypnosis, a botched escape bit and achieve climax by dancing together while playing "Ain't She Sweet" on opposite ends of the same guitar, never losing the beat or missing a note.

After perfecting their act in Vancouver, they journeyed to Los Angeles and San Francisco, where they performed at The Committee Theater and then shared the bill at the hungry i with Woody Allen, Noel Harrison, and Dick Cavett. In 1966, a Newsweek reporter caught the show at Chicago's Mother Blues. His story ran the same week they made their debut on national television on The Merv Griffin Show. A surge in bookings followed. For the next three years they performed in coffee houses, nightclubs, and concert halls appearing with fellow entertainers including Sarah Vaughan, Paul Butterfield, James Cotton, Stan Getz, The Chambers Brothers, Morgana King, and José Feliciano. They appeared on numerous TV shows including those of Steve Allen, Johnny Carson, Mike Douglas, David Frost, Dean Martin, the Kraft Music Hall and the Smothers Brothers. They had a three-week run off-Broadway and toured the United Kingdom with Frank Zappa and The Mothers of Invention.

The Times Square Two usually appeared as a specialty act on television and initially did not speak to the audience, assuming a deadpan delivery and launching into deliberately dated songs like "Okay, Toots!" and "Hello, Hawaii, How Are You?" In later appearances, "Mycroft" would introduce each song in florid speech, while making dismissive remarks about the stoic "Andrew" ("I am Mycroft Partner, and this... is who he has always been"). In this respect their stage personalities were very much like the British musical-revue team of Flanders and Swann, with "Mycroft" dominating the dialogue as Michael Flanders did, and accompanist "Andrew" suffering in silence like the bespectacled Donald Swann did.

== The end ==
Peter Elbling describes the end of their association thus:

"I quit the Times Square Two because we weren't coming up with new material and hadn't in a long time. Without realizing it, we had boxed ourselves into a corner by confining ourselves to material from the first two decades of the 1900s."

== Life after T.S.T. ==
Choquette went on to work for The National Lampoon and on editing a vast and ambitious comic book project with material from numerous internationally known cartoonists and media figures. The book was entitled "Someday Funnies" and was completed and published through Abrams ComicArts in 2011. Choquette teaches screen-writing and comedy writing at McGill University and Concordia University in Montreal.

Elbling was later a member of The Committee, acted on many televisions shows (including Taxi and WKRP) and films (including Phantom of the Paradise) during the 1970s and 80s, created the 1979 satirical NY Times Best Seller The 80s: A Look Back at the Tumultuous Decade 1980–1989, has written children's books as well as the international best selling novel The Food Taster.

== Sources ==
- LEVIN, Bob, August 2009, The Comics Journal, No. 299, p. 30-81, How Michel Choquette (Almost) Assembled the Most Stupendous Comic Book in the World, Starring: Harvey Kurtzman, Jack Kirby, Federico Fellini, Art Spiegelman, Wally Wood, Bill Griffith, Don Martin, Vaughn Bodē, William Burroughs, Michael O'Donoghue, Roy Thomas, Sergio Aragonés, Jann Wenner, Gahan Wilson, C. C. Beck, R. O. Blechman, Eugène Ionesco, Barry Windsor-Smith, Guido Crepax, Ralph Steadman, Steve Englehart, Salvador Dalí, Arnold Roth, Archie Goodwin, Shary Flenniken, Evert Geradts, Moebius, Denny O'Neil, Tom Wolfe, Will Eisner, Frank Zappa and many more
- Correspondence with Peter Elbling.
- Wednesday-Night, including an interview with Mr. Elbling
- The Paley Center in Beverly Hills collection (Golddiggers June 20, 1968 premiere episode)
