= Parodies of Harry Potter =

The immense popularity and wide recognition of J. K. Rowling's Harry Potter fantasy series has led to its being extensively parodied, in works spanning nearly every medium. The franchise holds the record for the most fan fiction parodies, at over 900,000 Some self-described parodies have been targeted by Rowling and her publishers as plagiarism, while others have sold hundreds of thousands of copies without any threat of legal sanction. Misinterpretations of Harry Potter parodies have sparked at least two urban legends. Many Harry Potter parodies are self-published; others are put out as part of major comic productions, such as Mad, The Simpsons, Saturday Night Live and Robot Chicken, all of which have parodied Harry Potter several times. Rowling has also been parodied (and parodied herself) in a number of instances.

== Books ==
=== In English ===
- Harry Rotter and the Goblet of Spunk, by Jon Lange, follows the young boy at his first year of school where he hopes to become famous like his deceased parents.
- Larry Bottem and the Sorcerer's Scone, by Jake Aroling, follows Larry, Mon, and Wormheinie in a quest to find free food scone.
- Barry Trotter is a series of Harry Potter parodies written by Michael Gerber and published in the UK in a small hardback format uniform to the new edition of Bored of the Rings. The series to date comprises Barry Trotter and the Shameless Parody (Barry Trotter and the Unauthorized Parody in the United States), Barry Trotter and the Unnecessary Sequel and Barry Trotter and the Dead Horse (Barry Trotter and the Happy Horse in the United States). The narrative features the adventures of "Barry Trotter", "Lon Measly", and "Ermine Cringer" who attend the "Hogwash School for Wizardry and Witchcrap". The book chronicles their attempts to prevent the making of a film, but the entire story is revealed to have been a film itself, which in turn is shown to be a novel being written by Barry Trotter.
- Harry Putter and the Chamber of Cheesecakes by Timothy R. O'Donnell.
- Hairy Pothead and the Marijuana Stone by Dana Larsen – a marijuana-laden book-length parody was released in the United States and Canada in October 2007 by Cannabis Culture magazine. The story parallels the original books, but instead of a wizard, Hairy Pothead is a "Weedster" and attends Hempwards School of Herbcraft and Weedery. Characters include Hempwards Master Head Alwaze Duinthadope and Professors Moruvva McGanjagal and Vacuous Vape. The book received extensive media coverage in Canada upon its release.
- Hairy Potty and the Underwear of Justice from The Captain Underpants Extra-Crunchy Book o' Fun by Dav Pilkey.
- Henry Potty and the Pet Rock: An Unauthorized Harry Potter Parody by Valerie Frankel is a satire of Harry Potter along with children's literature in general. In July 2008 the sequel, Henry Potty and the Deathly Paper Shortage, appeared. These narratives feature the adventures of Henry Potty, Really Wimpy, and Horrendous Gangrene who attend Chickenfeet Academy. The series is metafictional, as the characters know they're in a book, which Lord Revolting keeps trying to spoil.
- Parry Hotter and the Seamy Side of Magic by K.C. Ellis.
- Henry Shepherd and the Rock of Ages by Richard E. Salisbury is a Christian-themed parody of Harry Potter.
- "Howie Monroe and the Doghouse of Doom" by Bunnicula author James Howe and Brett Helquist. It features a dog named Howie Monroe who attends the Dogwiz Academy for Canine Conjurers. Howie must face "The-Evil-Force-Whose-Name-C'not-Be-Spoke", also known as Herbert, the fat cat who sat on his parents.
- "Barry Rotter and The Golf Lesson" by R. E. D. McNabb is a satirical short story that reverses Rowling's Harry Potter premise by having the main character escaping the magical world to have adventures in our own. It was published digitally on Smashwords in May 2011.
- Harry Potter and the Methods of Rationality by Eliezer Yudkowsky. His book illustrates topics in cognitive science and rationality, and has been favorably reviewed by author David Brin and FOSS programmer Eric S. Raymond.
- Harry Potter and the Secret Chamber Pot of Azerbaijan, a Comic Relief parody of the first two Harry Potter movies, starring Dawn French and Jennifer Saunders.
- Trans Wizard Harriet Porber and the Bad Boy Parasaurolophus by Chuck Tingle, written as a response to Rowling's views on transgender people.
- A subplot in the six-book sequel series "Phase Two" to Derek Landy's Skulduggery Pleasant series follows a trio of characters based on the protagonists of Harry Potter, named Never, Omen, and Auger Darkly, respectively based on Hermione Granger, Ron Weasley, and Harry Potter, with the latter referred to as a "Chosen One" supposedly prophesied to kill the all-powerful King of the Darklands. After apparently succeeding in Seasons of War in killing the self-declared "King of the Darklands" the Unnamed, whose death scene parodies that of Voldemort's from the film adaptation, the True King of the Darklands is revealed to be the Child of the Faceless Ones in Dead or Alive. A similar subplot parodying The Twilight Saga was present in the original series.
- Harry Otter and the Confectioner's Scone by J.G. Michael. This parody features Harry Otter, a Mongolian wizard with a bite mark on his leg, attending Houndstooth Wizard Boarding School with his friends Rawn and Harmony.

=== In Russian ===
- Porri Gatter (Порри Гаттер- a spoonerism of "Garri Potter", which is "Harry Potter" pronounced in Russian) is a series of Harry Potter parodies written by Belarusian authors Andrey Zhvalevskiy (Андрей Жвалевский) and Igor' Myt'ko (Игорь Мытько; lives in Moscow, Russia) in Russian. The series is based on an inversion of the Potter mythos: Porri is a technology user in a world of magicians. Four books have so far been published.
- Harri Proglotter ("Proglotter" is a pun on the Potter surname and the verb "проглотить" – "to swallow") by Sergey Panarin.
- Denis Kotik by Aleksandr Zorich.
- Larin Pyotr, by Yaroslav Morozov. Series of Harry Potter parodies
- A Boy Named Harry and his Dog Potter, by Valentin Postnikov.

=== In French ===
- Harry Cover (pronounced like haricots verts, French for green beans), a comic book parody of the Harry Potter series, written by Pierre Veys and drawn by Baka and Cristóbal Esdras, subsequently translated in Spanish and English.
- Harry Peloteur et la braguette magique (Harry Fondler and the Magic Zipper, a pun on baguette magique which is French for "magic wand"), a pornographic parody by "Nick Tammer" (sounds like the sexual expletive nique ta mère: possibly a pen name)
- Larry Bodter met de l'ordre à Phoenix, Arizona (Larry Bodter Sets Phoenix, Arizona in Order) by Yan Sored.
- Henri Potier à l'école des Quartiers (Henri Potier Goes to Posh School; potier literally means "potter") by Pierre de Laubier, 2011.

=== In Chinese ===
In China, a number of "fake" Harry Potter books were published, using Rowling's name. Bashu Publishing House from Chengdu agreed to pay a $2,500 fine and publish an apology for printing and distributing a Harry Potter novel that Rowling did not write. Other similar Chinese books included "Harry Potter and the Leopard-Walk-Up-to-Dragon" (this is literally text from Tolkien's "The Hobbit" with the character names changed to those of the Potter universe), "Harry Potter and the Golden Turtle", "Harry Potter and the Crystal Vase", "Harry Potter and the Porcelain Doll", "Harry Potter and Beaker and Burn", "Harry Potter and the Water Repelling Pearl", "Harry Potter and the Filler of Big".

=== In other languages ===
- Heri Kókler (Heri = pronunciation of Harry, Kókler = mountebank) is a Hungarian parody of the Harry Potter series by an author with the fake name K. B. Rottring, a pun on J. K. Rowling. ("K. B." is a Hungarian shorthand for "körülbelül", meaning "approximately", while Rotring is a pen manufacturer, and a generic term for mechanical pencils.) It has more books than the real series, but every real book has its pair.
- Harry Pouter by Peter M. Jolin, a series of Harry Potter parodies published in English and Czech language (under name Harry Trottel). To date there are three sequels.
- Happy Porter is a parody of the Harry Potter series in Indonesia.
- Hayri Potur Harry Potter'a Karşı (Hayri Potur against Harry Potter) is a parody of the Harry Potter series in Turkey which is written by Muzaffer İzgü.
- Harry Pórrez was a parody of the Harry Potter series. This Spanish comic book is divided into four parts: Harry Pórrez y el Misterio del Santo Grial (Harry Pórrez and the Mystery of the Holy Grail), Harry Pórrez y el Prisionero de Alacrán (Harry Pórrez and the Prisoner of Scorpion), Harry Pórrez y el Trofeo de Fuego (Harry Pórrez and the Trophy of Fire) and the last part, whose name is also the comic book's name Harry Pórrez y el As en la Manga de Condemort (Harry Pórrez and the Ace up Condemort's Sleeve).
- Larry Otter und der Knüppel aus dem Sack (Larry Otter and the Cudgel in the Sack) is a German parody of the first volume of the Harry Potter series by Frank Schmelzer using the pseudonym of Jane R. Rohling ("Rohling" is a German word for a brute/ruffian).
- Larry Potter is a comic by German author Fil, parodying both the Harry Potter series as stereotypes about magic in general.
- Harry Potra is a comic parody of the Harry Potter series in Catalan.
- Garry Poker is a Czech parody about young card players Garry Poker and his friends Hormone Danger and The Weasel (all the Weasels have weird first names) attending Hogfields College of Cards and Gambling and fighting Doctor Flssstfckmnst (He Who Cannot Be Spelled). Although Hogfields is only 4-year school, the series is divided into 7 parts according to original HP series. The author manages that by letting Garry fail exams in first book and making the tournament in fourth book take place during summer camp. To date, there are four complete books – Garry Poker and the Blue Ace of Spades, Garry Poker and his Blissful Years of Secrets, Garry Poker and the Prisoner of Az-Cardan, Garry Poker and the Goblet of Putrefy and several chapters of the fifth available in Czech, but the author made a list of names in English for further translations.

== Film and television ==
=== Films ===
- Harry Potter was one of many spoofs in the 2007 film Epic Movie.
- Richardson Productions LLC produced "Harvey Putter and the Ridiculous Premise" in 2010.
- Benjamin Sniddlegrass and the Cauldron of Penguins is a 2011 Australian parody feature/medium-length film inspired by the Kermode and Mayo film review programme. In his review of the film Percy Jackson & the Olympians: The Lightning Thief, BBC radio film critic Mark Kermode remarked that the general plot of the film was so similar to the Harry Potter series that it may as well have been called Benjamin Sniddlegrass and the Cauldron of Penguins. His co-host Simon Mayo declared that he wanted to see that film. Assembling a cast made up of performers from amateur musical theater societies around Sydney and penning the screenplay himself, Jeremy Dylan and his production team started shooting on 6 June 2010 and shot the film over seven days between June and mid-October, on location, in Australia.
- In Scary Movie 2, the book was parodied, titled "Harry Pothead", with a picture of Harry smoking on a bong.
- Whorrey Potter and the Sorcerer's Balls is a gay pornographic parody of the first film and novel, Harry Potter and the Sorcerer's Stone and was released in 2010.
- In The Starving Games, Harry Potter and friends appear briefly, only to be told that their film franchise has concluded and need not be parodied further.

=== U.S. television ===
==== Animated ====
- The Simpsons:
  - In "Wiz Kids", the third act of the episode "Treehouse of Horror XII", Lisa and Bart attend Springwart's School of Magicry, and must fight against the evil Lord Montymort (Montgomery Burns). Harry is in their class, and has just one line of dialogue (provided by Tress MacNeille): after Edna Krabappel accuses him of chewing gum in class he replies "No, ma'am, it's brimstone".
  - Lisa's favorite book series, Angelica Button, is a recurring gag and clearly a parody of Harry Potter:
    - In the episode "The Haw-Hawed Couple", Lisa asks Homer to read her Angelica Button book to her for bedtime. Homer, learning that the character Headmaster Greystash will die (à la Albus Dumbledore in Harry Potter and the Half-Blood Prince), hides the fact from Lisa by inventing a happier ending, though Lisa does read the real ending and decides that Homer's was better.
    - In the episode "Smoke on the Daughter", the Simpsons go to the midnight release of the final Angelica Button book. On the ride home from the store, Lisa skims through the book, revealing all of the best parts. Once Lisa reveals that the book ends well the Simpsons exclaim "Yay!" and all except Lisa throw their copies of the book out the car windows.
- Nigel Planter is a recurring character in the Cartoon Network series The Grim Adventures of Billy & Mandy. He first appeared in the episode "Toadblatt's School of Sorcery", which parodies Animal House as well as Harry Potter. He reappeared in the episodes "Nigel Planter and the Chamber Pot of Secrets", "One Crazy Summoner" and "Order of the Peanuts". The episodes feature Lord Moldybutt, a parody of Lord Voldemort, and whenever someone says his name, something unfortunate happens. Toadblatt's School of Sorcery is a parody of Hogwarts, and the Squid Hat, voiced by "Weird Al" Yankovic, is a parody of the Sorting Hat. The house of Weaslethorpe is a parody of Gryffindor and the opposing Gunderstank house is a parody of the Hogwarts house Slytherin.
  - In the episode "One Crazy Summoner", Billy seeks out Nigel Planter because he believes he can talk to snakes; Nigel later corrects him, stating that he cannot speak to snakes, but snacks. Nigel then asks for help winning the affections of Herfefnie Pfefferpfeffer, a parody of Hermione Granger, who ends up falling for Dorko Malfly, a parody of Draco Malfoy, instead.
  - In the episode "Order of the Peanuts", Mandy was able to predict how Nigel Planter would sneak into the school. She was right in guessing that he would fill the position of "Defence Against Really Dark Things", since it changes in every book and film. They also commented on the changing of Dumbledore's actor after the second film.
- In the American Dad! episode, "Dope and Faith", Roger is annoyed at Steve when he starts gloating about how special he is after being told this by a fortune teller at a carnival, and decides to play a prank on him in retaliation. He sends him a fake acceptance letter from Hogwarts, but the address given is actually that of a crackhouse. After Steve "enrols" he still fails to realize this, as he believes the outer appearance of the building is due to enchantments, that the crack operation is potions class, and that the Spanish-speaking dealers are chanting magic words. When Steve "borrows" some "Potions supplies", the dealers follow him home, and Roger convinces him that they are Death Eaters in disguise. Roger manages to defeat them in a shootout, although Steve believes that he himself vanquished them, as he had been wielding a chopstick given to him by Roger which he believed was a magic wand, and he was unable to see what was really going on due to having broken his glasses prior to the battle.
- Henry Skreever was the title of a book series mentioned in three episodes of the PBS Kids television series Arthur. In the first, "Prunella's Special Edition", a new book had just come out entitled Henry Skreever and the Cabbage of Mayhem and all the characters were reading it. The second, "Prunella Sees the Light", featured the Henry Skreever movie, Henry Skreever and the Brick of Wonders. This parody features the villain "Lord Moldywort." In the third, "Prunella Deegan and the Disappointing Ending", Marina and Prunella race to see who can finish reading the last book, The Knights of the Bouillabaisse, first. The school of magic that Henry attends is known as "Pigblisters" (Hogwarts). Students participate in the game "Soupitch" (Quidditch), a dangerous, mobile tree is called "The Mangling Maple" (The Whomping Willow), and instead of broomsticks, students ride on flying carpets.
- In the animated series Cyberchase, the young spellcaster Shari Spotter attends Frogsnorts school of magic under Professor Stumblesnore. The show's main characters must solve a series of magical themed logic problems to save the day.
- An episode of The Emperor's New School is called "The Prisoner of Kuzcoban", which is a parody of Harry Potter and the Prisoner of Azkaban.
- In the Clifford the Big Red Dog episode "Magic in the Air", Charley becomes so overly obsessed with fictional book character, Peter Poundstone (a series of books about a young wizard similar to the Harry Potter series), that he attempts to use magic to create a diorama (as part of a school assignment).
- An episode of the animated series The Adventures of Jimmy Neutron, Boy Genius, "Lights! Camera! Danger!", features Jimmy and his friends filming a movie. In one scene, Jimmy is Parry Bladder, who attends Pigpimples School, and needs to defeat a parody of the basilisk from Harry Potter and the Chamber of Secrets.
- In the Futurama episode "Crimes of the Hot", Al Gore is shown to have written a book called Harry Potter and the Balance of Earth, a more successful version of Earth in the Balance.
- In The Fairly OddParents episode "Wishology", one of Timmy's wishes is a Harry Potter parody. Vicky and Timmy are shown playing Quidditch, where Timmy portrays Harry, Vicky portrays Lord Moldywart (Lord Voldemort), and Poof is the "Purple" snitch.
- In the animated series Martha Speaks, the character TD is a fan of a character called Harry Blotter. TD sat down to watch a marathon of the films in the series. He said that all four prequels and all four sequels were being aired, followed by the premiere of the ninth film, which didn't make much sense, as there should already have been nine films if there were four prequels and four sequels. Blotter's enemy, possibly, is the "Dark Lord of Really Dark Darkness", though this may have been a character created by TD for a school project about Thomas Edison.
- In the Mad episode "Potions 11 / Moves Like Jabba", Harry Potter gathers a team of wizards to find a wand that will let the franchise live forever in a parody of Ocean's 11.
- In the animated series Fanboy & Chum Chum, there are two child wizard characters; a British red-headed boy named Kyle Bloodworth-Thomason, a parody of Ron Weasley, and his German blond-haired rival, Sigmund the Sorcerer, who is a parody of Draco Malfoy.

==== Non-animated ====
- Harry Potter has been parodied several times on the U.S. sketch comedy Saturday Night Live. In all sketches, Harry is portrayed by Rachel Dratch except for the "Welcome Back Potter" sketch in which Harry is played by Will Forte. In addition, Hermione Granger was played by Lindsay Lohan, who wore a revealing sweater that showed a good deal of her breasts, causing Harry and Ron, then the Weasley twins, and even Snape and Hagrid to gawk at her in amazement and lust. (The boys decide to use the Invisibility Cloak to spy on Hermione in the bath.) This was to parody the fact that Hermione had reached puberty. A recent sketch featuring J. K. Rowling (played by Amy Poehler) showed deleted scenes from Harry Potter and the Prisoner of Azkaban where Albus Dumbledore (played by Bill Hader) acts gay. More recently, Daniel Radcliffe played Harry in a sketch where it has been ten years since his graduation (though this was never shown in the books), and is still at Hogwarts as a tenant. Harry meets new students and realizes Ron and Hermione have become professors.
- Harry Potter has also been parodied on MADtv, where Triple H played Harry.
- The Disney Channel comedy series So Random! featured a sketch called "Harry Potter: In The Real World", showing Harry in the real world, trying to find a job at fictional fast food restaurant, Flippy's. Harry's lightning bolt scar and his birth scroll are shown. The So Random Christmas special featured a sketch called "Volde-mart", where Voldemort owns a supermarket and can't get any of his Voldemort dolls to sell, and is furious when he finds out that the Harry Potter dolls are flying off the shelves, so furious that he uses the Avada Kedavra curse on a Harry Potter cardboard cutout in similar style to how Ralph Fiennes as Voldemort uses the curse when he destroys the Horcrux in Harry in Harry Potter and the Deathly Hallows – Part 2. Also, as a parody of the final film, Harry Potter enters and says Daniel Radcliffe's line, "Come on Tom, let's finish this the way we started it, together." and then hugs Voldemort. Also mentioned in this sketch is Toy's R Severus, in parody of the character Severus Snape.
- "Harry Bladder" was a sketch shown on the sketch comedy series All That. Instead of flying on a broom, Harry rode a leaf-blower. The sketch also featured a bowlegged Professor Chafe.
- In the series Wizards of Waverly Place, the episodes "Wizard School Part 1" and "Wizard School Part 2" features Alex and Justin Russo going to a wizarding summer school named Wiz-tech, where everyone wears round glasses and yellow and black robes. When Alex sees the similarities, she says, "You remind me of someone. Terry something... Barry something... Larry something! Oh, forget it." Dumbledore is parodied as Headmaster Crumbs, Draco Malfoy is parodied as Jerko Phoenix, and the villain is named Dr. Evilini, who plans on taking Justin's powers. Quidditch is parodied through a game called 12-ball, which is similar to ping pong. To end the game, you "hit the tattler"; tattler also being another name for a "snitch." In another episode of the same series, Alex, Justin and Max magically travel to an apartment where they meet author H. J. Darling, (a parody of J. K. Rowling) to inquire as to her reasoning for using stories from their lives in her series called "Charmed and Dangerous", (a parody of the Harry Potter books themselves).
- An episode of Pair of Kings featured a flashback showing King Brady at school, when he used to dress up like Harry Potter, and dubbed himself as Brady Potter, and even addressed his twin brother King Boomer as Boomer Weasley, but eventually stopped doing so, after he, along with Boomer, were tied up by the school bully, Rondo, who used Brady's incredibly long scarf.
- Harry Potter was also parodied in the series Ned's Declassified School Survival Guide in the episode "Guide to: Substitute Teachers and The New Kid". In the end of "The New Kid" part, a boy wearing glasses, clothes and a scarf similar to Harry Potter's in the film series appears, wanting to go on a tour of the school. In a Halloween-themed episode, Ned has to take his BAT test, a parody of OWLs.
- In the Fetch episode "CSI: Ruff", a school called Dogwarts is featured, which is a reference to Hogwarts.
- In Episode 4281 of Sesame Street, Telly & Gordon are looking for Gordon's reading glasses in order for Telly to read the latest Furry Potter book, Furry Potter and the Goblet of Fur by J. K. Furball.
- Harry Potter was also mentioned in the Drake & Josh episode "Megan's New Teacher".

=== UK television ===
- In the final episode of Only Fools and Horses, titled "Sleepless in Peckham", Del and Rodney try to come up with money-making ideas. Del's idea is for Rodney to write a Harry Potter book but Rodney refuses due to copywriting. Del informs Rodney to change the name to 'Harry Trotter', calling him "a little git with John Lennon glasses".
- In the first series of The Legend of Dick and Dom, Princes Dick and Dom send their terrible wizard, Mannitol, back to wizard school while they hunt down a dragon's clack, the next potion ingredient.
- Alistair McGowan, on his show Big Impression, did a sketch called "Louis Potter and the Philosopher's Scone". It featured impressions of Louis Theroux (as Harry Potter), Neil and Christine Hamilton (as the Dursleys), Nigella Lawson (as Hermione), Anne Robinson (as Ron), Mark Lawrenson (as the Quirrell-figure) and Gary Lineker (as the Voldemort figure). It also featured impressions of Robbie Coltrane (as Hagrid) and Alan Rickman (as Snape), these last two being the actual actors who played parts in the film.
- BBC satirical comedy programme Dead Ringers featured Harry Potter in several sketches over the years, at one point spoofing Star Wars, Potter and The Lord of the Rings in a single sketch, calling attention to the mysterious old magician who befriends the young male lead character.
- In 2003, Comic Relief performed a spoof story called Harry Potter and the Secret Chamberpot of Azerbaijan. It featured Dawn French as a female Harry; Jennifer Saunders as Ron Weasley and J. K. Rowling; Miranda Richardson as Hermione; Nigel Planer as Dumbledore (wearing the beard and costume of Richard Harris); Jeremy Irons as Professor Severus Snape; Alison Steadman as Minerva McGonagall; Ronnie Corbett as Hagrid and Basil Brush as Dobby the house elf. The broadcast of this parody was preceded by a message from J. K. Rowling. French was subsequently cast as The Fat Lady in 2004's Harry Potter and the Prisoner of Azkaban, while Richardson was later cast as Rita Skeeter in Harry Potter and the Goblet of Fire. The end of Secret Chamberpot featured an advert for the sequel, Gobs of Fire, which was never made. It is unknown whether it was ever planned, or if it was just a spoof.
- 2DTV featured a sketch in which an Ofsted inspector was inspecting Hogwarts. The inspector found no faults with the school, except for the atrocious acting of the Year 9 students (Harry, Ron and Hermione).
- Episode 2.3 of the BBC comedy Extras featured a thinly-veiled spoof of Harry Potter with Daniel Radcliffe and Warwick Davis parodying their own Potter roles. Radcliffe's character was repeatedly shown trying to seduce his female co-workers on the set, but failed miserably and blamed them when he was caught by his mother.
- Gromit, from the Wallace and Gromit short film series graduated from Dogwarts University; Dogwarts is a parody of Hogwarts.
- Flacky Rotter and the Friend Count of Justice was a parody shown in the second series of the CBBC TV series TMI.
- In one episode of the short-lived CBBC series Gina's Laughing Gear, a short parody of Harry Potter (and Supernanny) was shown, wherein Supernanny attempted to punish the trio of protagonists (played by different actors in an attempt to parody the originals) with the "Naughty step", later getting transfigured into a mouse and placed in "Ron"'s pocket.
- In the Doctor Who episode The Shakespeare Code, The Doctor and Martha Jones talk about witches and refer to the book series, she says: "It's all a bit Harry Potter", to which The Doctor replies saying that he already read 'Book 7' and that he cried at the end (the episode aired three months before the book's publication, explaining why it is referred as 'Book 7'). At the end of the episode William Shakespeare, Martha Jones use the ancient word Expelliarmus (a Harry Potter spell) to banish the Carrionites; because of the success of banishing the Carrionites, The Doctor shouts: "Good old J.K.!". There are also some small references in the episode about David Tennant, who plays The Doctor and also played Barty Crouch Jr. in the fourth Harry Potter film.
- An episode of The Pinky and Perky Show has an episode with a character named Harry Trotter.
- An episode of Bear Behaving Badly titled Nev the Bear Wizard features a parody of the Harry Potter series, in which Nev the Bear is transported through a magic door into The School of Magic And Magic Stuff. The main characters of the series are then shown as parodies of characters from the Harry Potter series; Nev is Nevvy Potter, Crazy Keith is Keithione, Dorris is Ronnis, Aunt Barbra is Bagrid, Postie is Poochie, and Mr Prank is Valdiprank.

=== Other television ===
- The Wedge, an Australian sketch comedy, parodies Harry and Hermione in love on a "Cooking With..." show before being caught by Snape.
- An episode of Kirby: Right Back at Ya!, also known as Kirby of the Stars in its original Japanese version, titled "A Novel Approach", features a book titled "Pappy Pottey and the Fool's Stone".
- Berndi Broter und der Kasten der Katastrophen (literally "Berndi Broter and the case of disasters"), an episode of the German children's television puppet character Bernd das Brot, who attend Blockharz.
- In many episodes of 'You're Skitting Me!' (an Australian comedy show), there are Harry Potter parodies always ending in a character saying "You just HAD to invite Voldemort, didn't you?"
- In Tensou Sentai Goseiger, the Dark Headder Bari-Boru-Dara of the Uniberus Headder (ユニベロスヘッダーのバリ・ボル・ダラ, Yuniberosu Heddā no Bari Boru Dara) was named after the Harry Potter books.

== Publications ==
=== The Onion ===
- The spoof newspaper The Onion has parodied Harry Potter several times, most notably in the article "Harry Potter Books Spark Rise in Satanism Among Children", which satirized the hysteria of the American Christian Right over the supposedly Satanic influence of the novels on the young. The article was copied into a chain letter and circulated among critics of the series as proof of their claims.
- Another Onion article, "Children, Creepy Middle-Aged Weirdos Swept Up in Harry Potter Craze", referenced the books' popularity among people one would assume were too old for them.
- ONN, the Onion's satirical spoof of television news, carried an item in the lead up to release of the final Harry Potter book entitled "JK Rowling hints at Harry Potter date rape".
- The Onion also satirized the Harry Potter fandom's fear of spoilers, particularly in the run-up to the final book, with an article stating that Harry Potter and the Deathly Hallows had itself been attacked for containing spoilers.

=== Mad magazine ===
- Harry Plodder and the Kidney Stone – a text-driven parody of the first book written by Desmond Devlin, illustrated by James Warhola. Cover story of Mad No. 391 (March 2000 issue).
- Harry Plodder and the Sorry-Ass Story— a parody of the first film, by Desmond Devlin, illustrated by Mort Drucker. Cover story of Mad No. 412 (December 2001). (The parody was retitled "Harry Plodder and the Philistine Story" in overseas editions of Mad where the book and film's original title was used. Artist Drucker, who has worked for Mad since 1956, inspired the villain's parody name: Lord Druckermort.)
- Harry Plodder and the Lamest of Sequels— a parody of the second film, by Desmond Devlin, illustrated by Tom Richmond. Cover story of Mad No. 424 (December 2002).
- Harry Plodder and the Pre-Teen Nerds are Actin' Bad – a parody of the third film, by Desmond Devlin, illustrated by Hermann Mejia. Cover story of Mad No. 443 (July 2004).
- Harry Plodder Has Gotta Retire – a parody of the fourth film, by Desmond Devlin, illustrated by Hermann Mejia. Cover story of Mad No. 460 (December 2005).
- Harry Plodder and the Torture of the Fanbase – a parody of the fifth film, by Desmond Devlin, illustrated by Tom Richmond. Cover story of Mad No. 480 (August 2007).
- Harry Plodder is a Hot-Blooded Putz – a parody of the sixth film, by Desmond Devlin, illustrated by Hermann Mejia. Appeared in Mad No. 501 (October 2009).
- Harry Plodder and It's Dreadful What Follows; a parody of the seventh film, by Desmond Devlin, illustrated by Tom Richmond. Appeared in Mad No. 507 (February 2011).
- Harry Plodder is Definitely Halted -- Adieu! – a parody of the eighth film, by Desmond Devlin, illustrated by Hermann Mejia. Appeared in the Mad Presents Harry Potter special edition (September 2011). The edition also reprinted all of the above articles, as well as additional Potter-related material that had been published by Mad.

=== Other publications ===
- In their May 2004 issue, the U.S. Army publication Preventive Maintenance Monthly, which instructs soldiers on how to maintain their equipment, featured a spoof comic based on Harry Potter, featuring a character named Topper who resided at Mogmarts School under Professor Rumbledore. The publication received notice from Rowling's lawyers that the comics breached copyright, though the magazine's editor claimed that no violation had taken place, as "The drawings do not look like any of the characters from Harry Potter."
- A parody of Hogwarts can be seen in Futurama Comics No. 16. While trying to find a boarding school for Cubert, the crew visits a magic school on the planet Rowling VI. Cubert's insistence that a school cannot exist solely based on faith causes the school and the magical creatures within it to vanish.
- "Continuing the Magic", in Time by Lon Tweeten, shows possible future book covers laced with pop culture references such as "The Audition of Doom" with Simon Cowell judging Harry harshly, "The Paris Hilton Enchantment" with a trio of familiar Dementors, and "Dark Lord of the Dance" with Voldemort and Harry teaming up on Broadway.
- In the comic strip The Argyle Sweater, Harry Potter and the Sorcerer's Stone is satirized in a panel, where Dumbledore has passed a bladder stone and the doctor tells Harry that Dumbledore must avoid strenuous sorcery for a week and to lay off the potion.
- In the comic book series Tozzer, the titular character studies at an acting school called Boarboils, a parody of Hogwarts. The character Tozzer is also occasionally depicted with a swastika scar on his forehead, and believes that he is a magician.
- An issue of The Beano briefly depicted the character Herbert (of The Bash Street Kids) reading a book entitled Harry Potter and the Movie Rites.
- A Christian parody of Harry Potter entitled Hairy Polarity and the Sinister Sorcery Satire follows the adventure of Ari Potiphar and his friend Minne, who soon find out that demons have possessed them and only the power of prayer can save them.
- The comic strip "Harry Botter" appeared in issue 111, Dec/Jan 2001, of Viz. "Botter" is derived from the word "bottom", (buttocks) and the story is focused on the schoolboy protagonist's anus.
- The Unwritten is a comic book series about the nature of stories and storytelling, and their social impacts, which incorporates several elements of the Harry Potter series into its preeminent fiction-within-a-fiction series Tommy Taylor.
- In Alan Moore and Kevin O'Neill's comic book series The League of Extraordinary Gentlemen, which crosses over countless works of fiction in the same universe, the third volume chronicles events that culminate in the events of the Harry Potter series. In the novel, an unrecognizable Harry is portrayed as the Anti-Christ, and all his adventures have merely been staged to manipulate him into destroying the world. On learning this, Harry destroys Hogwarts and murders everyone in it, including Ron and Hermione. Various characters describe Harry as 'banal.' He appears at the end of the novel as a rapidly mutating monster before he is destroyed by God taking the form of Mary Poppins. None of the characters or locations in the series are mentioned by name to avoid conflict with J.K. Rowling, as Moore has done with other characters belonging to other authors. No references are made to any of the actual events of the series, and the summary given of them is inconsistent with the actual story.

== Online ==
=== Movies and animations ===
==== Potter Puppet Pals ====
- Potter Puppet Pals, created by Neil Cicierega, is a series of live-action puppet show performances parodying the Harry Potter book and film series. Episodes so far have been about Snape with disastrous results (titled "Bothering Snape") and killing Lord Voldemort with machine guns (titled "Trouble at Hogwarts"). Fifteen further videos, featuring real puppets ("Potions Class", "Wizard Angst", "The Mysterious Ticking Noise", "Wizard Swears", "School Is For Losers", "Albus Dumbledore Lists Your Good Qualities", "The Vortex", "Ron's Disease", "Snape's Diary", "INSANELY important Potter Puppet Pals news!", "Harry Potter personally welcomes you. Yes, you." "Ron's Parents", "Harry's Nightmares", "Draco Puppet", "Mustache Buddies","Ginny" and "Neville's Birthday") have been released on YouTube, as well as the illustrated "Potter Puppet Christmas Card + Yule Ball 2010 info!" The episode "The Mysterious Ticking Noise", based around the concept of a musical ostinato, has become very popular on YouTube since its publication in March 2007, and is the 25th most viewed video of all time on the website, with over 135,000,000 views. The episode later aired on UK television as part of the CBBC programme Chute!. Live shows at "The Yule Ball" have also been performed, which can also be found on YouTube.
  - There was also a cancelled episode, The Potter Puppet Pals Adventure, which still exists in audio form, and has been animated by a member of the Lemon Demon wiki. In it, Rubeus Hagrid, the Dursleys, and Draco Malfoy were originally slated to appear.

==== Harry Potter and the Deathly Weapons ====
- Harry Potter and the Deathly Weapons is a 2020 fan edit of the 2001 film Harry Potter and the Philosopher's Stone. In the full-length, unauthorised edit, all of the wands are digitally replaced with guns. The parody took five years to create, and was described by its creator as a joke, "with over 175 brand-spankin' new good-enough-looking special effects shots". A review in Vice found the fan edit "Tarantino-worthy", while another in Screen Rant found the digital replacement of wands to range from seamless to "less successful". Scene changes include Hagrid shooting Dudley in the buttocks, Hermione performing the "Wingardium Leviosa" spell with a gun, and shooting Neville in the head instead of immobilising him. The creator of the fan edit stated that it started out as a "tasteless joke" in the wake of mass shootings and noted how easy it was to put guns in Hollywood film. In a website for the parody, links are included to organisations opposed to gun violence and the site invites viewers to "see how riddikulus the notion of guns in schools looks".

==== Other videos ====
- Dark Lord Funk – Harry Potter Parody of "Uptown Funk" is a YouTube video produced by KFaceTV. The video parodies both the Harry Potter series and English producer Mark Ronson's music video for "Uptown Funk" (which features guest vocals by American recording artist Bruno Mars). In the music video, Lord Voldemort and his Death Eaters, including Bellatrix Lestrange, taunt Harry Potter with a choreographed song telling him that the Dark Lord will "Funk you up". Voldemort and his followers are shown in a variety of scenes (similar to the Mark Ronson video, including Voldemort in a barber shop wearing pink curlers) singing to Harry. In the video, Voldemort is also the lead singer of a band called 'Tom & The Riddles.' J.K. Rowling called the video "a work of genius.” Jason Isaacs (whose character Lucius Malfoy is not in the video) described the video as "funking amazing...sheer unadulterated genius.” Originally published in March 2015, the video had more than 7 million YouTube views in its first three weeks, and now has more than 14.5 million views.
- Annoying Orange produced a Harry Potter-themed video Orange Potter and the Deathly Apple which contained these character and spell parodies. Originally published in July 2011, the YouTube video has more than 14.2 million views.
  - Orange Potter (parody of Harry Potter/Orange)
  - Snapefruit (parody of Snape/Grapefruit)
  - Pear Weasley (parody of Ron/Pear)
  - Passion Granger (parody of Hermione/Passion Fruit)
  - Moldy Warts (parody of Voldemort)
  - Grandpa Lemondore (parody of Dumbledore/Grandpa Lemon)
  - Jellyarmis (parody of Expelliarmus)
  - AppleCadabra (parody of Avada Kedavra a.k.a. The Death Curse)
- Harry Potter and the Dark Lord Waldemart is a parody of Harry Potter produced by Walmart Watch to illustrate their negative perspective of Walmart. Published in October 2006, the parody video has more than 2.4 million views.
- Harry Potter und ein Stein (Harry Potter and a Stone) is a parody of Harry Potter and the Philosopher's Stone. The videos feature the film dubbed in German. The original parody, produced by YouTube user Coldmirror, has been reposted by YouTube user GamerXC3. Since this secondary publishing in August 2012, the video has had more than 1.6 million views. Two sequels were released, a parody of Harry Potter and the Chamber of Secrets called Harry Potter und der geheime Pornokeller (Harry Potter and the Secret Porn Basement) and a parody of Harry Potter and the Goblet of Fire called Harry Potter und der Plastikpokal (Harry Potter and the Plastic Cup) which was never finished due to copyright claims by Warner Bros.
- Harry Cook and the Goblet of Borscht (Russian: Гарри Повар и кубок Борща) is a parody of Harry Potter and the Goblet of Fire produced by kora0081. The video features the Russian dub of the film. Published in September 2013, the video has more than 1.2 million views.
- Harry Potter, Bad Roommate is a YouTube video series produced by ShakeState where three students live together with Harry Potter as their roommate. The episodes involve Harry trying to cope with a post-modern, non-magical society. For instance, he still believes that Lord Voldemort is after him and that Dementors and Death Eaters are a constant threat, to the great annoyance of his roommates. The actors include Jon Frederick as Mike, Dawan Owens as Brad, and Mark R. Gerson as Harry. There is a fourth actor whose name changes in the opening credits of every episode. These names include Trip Taylor, Flip Hawkins, Chip Cosby, and Blaze "Rip" Nyugen. First produced in April 2007, the video series has more than a million YouTube views.
- Harry Potter and the Ten Years Later is a YouTube video series produced by FuriousMolecules. A parody of the Harry Potter series, it is set ten years after the events of the last book (ignoring the epilogue). Published in October 2012, the series had almost a million views in its first two years.
- String Studios LLC produced a Harry Potter parody for YouTube, Half-Blood Pimp: Hermione does Hogwarts. Published in February 2007, the video has more than 100,000 views.
- Harry Potter and the Music Video Parody (about Hermione!), a parody of "Let It Go" from Disney's Frozen, is a YouTube video produced by Perfectly Serious Productions that parodies actual scenes from the Harry Potter films as well as some added shots:. Hermione sings to the audience about how she was the one who really did all the work and should get the recognition instead of Harry. Published in March 2016, the video has more than 83,000 views.
- Harry Potter and the Rejected Scenes was a three-part YouTube video series produced by TheFineBros around 2010-2011. Using official toy figurines and sometimes South Park-style mouth movements, the three-to-four minute videos provided comical discussions between main characters in the Harry Potter series, with plenty of meta moments. In the first episode, Harry chooses to side with Draco Malfoy upon meeting him, explaining to Ron his reasoning for this, then later gets sorted into Slytherin and intends to assist Lord Voldemort. In the second episode, Hermione and Ron share their concerns with Harry about the adult male characters' attempts to groom Harry, including Hagrid and Sirius asking Harry to visit their abodes late at night, Dumbledore curiously inquiring as to Harry's relationship with Hermione and reminding Harry to let Professor Slughorn 'collect' him, and Lupin always offering Harry chocolate treats. The third episode involves Harry gathering all his romantic interests from the films (Ginny, Cho and the waitress from Half-Blood Prince), pointing out the variety of different ethnicities of the women he's been interested in, then explaining who he has chosen as his lover (Luna Lovegood).

=== Online audio ===
- Harry Potter and the Half-Assed Parody is a chapter-by-chapter parody of Harry Potter and the Half-Blood Prince. It was written and performed by The Deadly Abridgment and is currently available on both iTunes and YouTube.
- Dirty Potter is a trilogy of audio shorts were made through creative use of word splicing and sound editing. The characters have been reimaged into overly lustful and sex-crazed; frequently engaging in comedic and lewd activities and using vulgar language. Each audio short is narrated by British actor Jim Dale, who also has been reimaged in the context of the parody. These clips were previously only hosted on YouTube, but were "removed due to a Terms of Use violation". The clips are now available at the "Dirty Potter" website and have since been re-added to YouTube.
- Harry Potter and the Scary Tiki Mask is a parody of Harry Potter and the Half-Blood Prince. It was written and voiced entirely by Andrew Lemonier, a former actor and comedy writer. The videos are available on YouTube.

=== Webcomics ===
- The Order of the Stick used a character for strip No. 253 named Larry Gardener, a student at Warthog's School of Wizardry and Sorcery, who was quickly killed off.
- Webcomic Sluggy Freelance's main character is Torg, a bright but uncomplicated character whose last name we never learn. In Pete Abrams' first parody, Torg Potter and the Sorcerer's Nuts, Torg is mistaken for the Lastnameless One and brought into Hoggelrynth to learn magic. He subsequently defeats a plot by Professor Santory Snapekin to achieve ultimate power. Despite Torg's not having any actual magic powers, he is embroiled in a plot to turn everybody into chocolate in Torg Potter and the Chamberpot of Secretions. In Torg Potter and the President from Arkansas, Blearious Stank escapes from prison, and Torg is considered to be in danger due to being the "Torg Potter of Record". Torg is jibported back to Hoggelrynth to take part in the Tri-Gizzard Tournament in Torg Potter and the Giblets with Fiber. The parodies are modelled after the films rather than the books, and follow the film releases.
- The webcomic VG Cats featured a parody of Harry Potter (Wise Advice: Fullmetal vs. Harry Potter) in which Harry finds the Philosopher's Stone at the same time as Edward and Alphonse Elric from the Japanese media franchise Fullmetal Alchemist. The result is Harry and Edward getting into a fight after several insults are exchanged.
- The webcomic Gunnerkrigg Court featured a short scene where the main characters, Annie and Kat, hear about a new student the local bully is tormenting. Just before the bully can hang the boy (who looks exactly like a cartoon Harry Potter) up on the flagpole, Annie and Kat stop him and chase the bully away. However, instead of being grateful, he claims that he and his wand had it under complete control. When Annie points out the "wand" is just a twig, he gets offended and tries to cast a spell on Annie and Kat in exactly the same pose as Harry in the film series when he casts a powerful spell. Nothing happens and Annie and Kat end up hanging him up on the flagpole themselves.
- Wizard School is a webcomic parody of Harry Potter, in which an eight-year-old "chosen one" with a mark on his forehead is replaced by the villain, a drunken adult jerk with a tattoo, who attends the school for wizards in his place.
- Potters and Potions is a screencap comic in the vein of Darths and Droids, or DM of the Rings. It follows the plot of the film series, as if the characters were players in an RPG.
- Harry Potter and the Portrait of What Looked Like a Large Pile of Ash is a one-chapter predictive text-assisted short story produced using software from Botnik Studios. A predictive text keyboard was created using all seven volumes of J.K.Rowling's books, and the output text resembled her writing style.

== Stage ==
- Puffs, or Seven Increasingly Eventful Years at a Certain School of Magic and Magic is a 2015 original play by New York-based playwright Matt Cox. The play is a comedic retelling of the Harry Potter series, but from the perspective of the "Puffs".
- In August 2006, Potted Potter (subtitled "The Unauthorized Harry Experience") by Dan & Jeff (Daniel Clarkson and Jefferson Turner) of Potted Productions premiered at the Edinburgh Fringe festival in Scotland. It continues to tour venues worldwide today, after sell out runs in London's West End and New York, and has even been translated into Spanish for a run in Mexico City in 2014. It abbreviates all seven canonical books into seventy minutes. It was nominated for the Olivier 'Best Entertainment' award in 2012.
- In April 2009, a group of University of Michigan students (StarKid Productions) performed "Harry Potter: The Musical", a two-act musical parody that featured major elements from all seven books and an original score. They posted the entire musical on their YouTube channel but removed it in late June, to edit some more mature elements from the videos. The musical, retitled A Very Potter Musical, was reposted on 5 July 2009. The plot followed Voldemort's attempts to return to his body using Professor Quirrell and the House Cup Tournament. A sequel was premiered at the 2010 HPEF Harry Potter Conference Infinitus. The sequel was later released on YouTube on 22 July at 8pm EST, called A Very Potter Sequel, and featured the Death Eaters using the Time-Turner to go back in time to Harry's first year at Hogwarts. At Leakycon 2012 in Chicago, A Very Potter Senior Year was performed. The script and soundtrack were released on 15 December and it premiered on YouTube on 15 March 2013 at 8pm EST.
- In 2005, the University of Queensland Law Revue released Harry Potter's Scar, a parody of the song Scar by Missy Higgins, where a hormonal Harry (on piano) and Silent Bob-style Dumbledore (on guitar) pitched "Harry Potter: The Musical" to J.K. Rowling.
- In 2011, Push the Limits Performance Company in Australia performed Barry Popper and the Return of the Dark Lord, written by Trick Cole and directed by Trick Cole and Tate Bennett. It featured characters such as Barry Popper, Ren Beaseley, Harmony Grunge and Professor Dumbledoofus going on a quest to defeat the Dark Lord Monty (Voldemort's younger brother). A sequel is being written.
- Harry Podder: Dude Where's My Wand?, a play by Desert Star Theater in Utah, written by sisters Laura J., Amy K. and Anna M. Lewis. The plot, which takes place at the Utah-based Warthogs school for wizards, features Harry Podder, Hermione Ranger, Ron Sneasley, Professor McGargoyle and the Dark wizard Voldie.
- Henry Botter and the Curse of Dracula, a 2007 Halloween-themed cross-parody of Harry Potter and Dracula, written and directed by Logan Rogan.
- Acid Reflux Comedy Troupe of Chicago, Illinois had a sketch comedy show titled "Harry Potty and the Order of the Wenis" in August 2007.
- The Chuckle Brothers toured the stage show Barry Potty and his Smarter Brother Paul in the Chamber of Horrors.
- Harry Potter and the Obnoxious Voice – The Parody!, a cross-parody of Stranger than Fiction and the Harry Potter books and films, written by Jeannette Jaquish in 2007 for actors aged five to adult. The story's theme is the widening rift between facts of both the book and film series demonstrated in bizarre "changes" at Hogwarts that only Harry can see. Comic scenes of Dobby and Winky panicking over missing cheese, Ron slopping a potion on Snape, Dumbledore missing his meal ticket as well as his mind, and Malfoy deflecting a dementor as he earns his free lunch in the Hogwarts cafeteria poke fun at the icons of J.K. Rowling's books. In 2010, Jaquish wrote two additional scenes which added Peeves, Moaning Myrtle, Luna Lovegood and the Hogwarts Kitchen House Elves. The show first played at the Firehouse Theater in Fort Wayne, Indiana in September 2007, and since has performed in the United Kingdom and many U.S. states, and toured Australia.
- From April 2008 through July 2009, the comedy troupe Luna-C Productions performed 'Potter Live in 45' at science fiction conventions in the Mid-Atlantic region of the United States. In 45 minutes, the cast of Luna-C hit the high points of all seven books.
- Sally Cotter and the Censored Stone, a parody written by Dean O'Carroll and published by Playscripts Inc. in April 2009, features Sally Cotter, a young girl who falls asleep while reading the series and wakes up at Frogbull Academy. During her dream, Sally meets characters such as Reubenon Ryebread, Shiftia Shape, and Professor Albatross Underdrawers. But with danger lurking, Sally, along with her friends Dave and Harmonica, must try to defeat the evil Lord Murderdeath with the constant interruptions from the Censor.
- The sketch comedy group "Divine Comedy" from Brigham Young University has done multiple spoofs, most notably "Hillary Potter", "Harry Potter and the One Where Dumbledore Dies", and "Potter Wars".
- The University of Otago student revue of 2008 parodied Harry Potter in sketches such as "Harry Potter and the Deathly Hellos", and in 2002, the show was entitled "Harry Pothead gets the Philosopher Stoned".
- The Gaslight Theater in Tucson, AZ showed a parody titled Henry Porter and the Sorcerer's Secret from 3 September 2015 through late October or early November 2015. The tag line for the production was "The Boy Who Ad-Libbed".

== Audio tracks ==
- RiffTrax released parody audio commentaries of all eight Harry Potter films. RiffRaff Theater has also released a commentary of the first film.
- Wizard People, Dear Reader, an audiobook that acts as an alternate soundtrack to the film version of Harry Potter and the Philosopher's Stone.

== Other media ==
The "Harry Potter cow" erected in Leicester Square

- In 2002, the public art exhibition CowParade, which travels the world erecting cow-themed sculptures in major cities before selling them at auction for charity, erected a broomstick-riding Harry Potter cow in London's Leicester Square. When the organisers attempted to take it down, they were prevented by public outcry.
- Jared Lee, an equestrian-themed T-shirt and home goods graphic company, has designed T-shirts showing a horse riding a broomstick and wearing a cape, with the words "Hairy Trotter" below the picture. These T-shirts have become popular and are sold through several major equestrian retailers.
- Cows Ice Cream of Prince Edward Island, Canada, which is famous for making cow-themed parodies of many different works of popular culture, has a parody called Cowy Potter (also Dairy Potter), including "The Prisoner of Azcowban" and "The Goblet of Milk"
- In Wacky Packages All-New Series 1, Hairy Patter is a parody of Harry Potter.
- The clothing retailer Hanes has produced a shirt that reads "Harry Pothead and the Sorcerer's Stoned".
- The Garbage Pail Kids All-New Series 1 card #40a, Harry Potty, is a parody of Harry Potter.
- Harry Potthead is a Newgrounds flash game that shows Harry Potter using objects as bongs (including a pigeon, a squirrel, and a gun), as well as sniffing glue. The game is infamous for its visuals (which have an altered hue color), its music, and the fact that Harry is portrayed as stupid, smiling wide at the player. The object of the game is to do three of the actions, before choosing "Smoke a Gun", in which Harry shoots himself in the head. The game was developed and programmed by Tom Fulp, the creator of the website.

== J. K. Rowling parodies ==
J. K. Rowling's appearance on The Simpsons

J. K. Rowling, the creator of the Harry Potter series, has been parodied several times:

- Rowling made a guest appearance as herself on the American animated sitcom The Simpsons, in a special British-themed episode entitled "The Regina Monologues". The dialogue consisted of a short conversation between Rowling and Lisa Simpson, who mispronounces Rowling's name. She acknowledges Lisa with "Thank you, young Muggle". When Lisa asks her about the ending of Harry Potter, Rowling sighs and says: "He grows up, and marries you. Is that what you want to hear?" to which Lisa swoons and dreamily replies, "Yes!" before Rowling rolls her eyes and walks away.
- Rowling is also parodied in an episode of Adult Swim's Robot Chicken, in which a character from the future travels through time in an attempt to completely destroy her chance at fame by giving Rowling a terrible idea for a novel: "A raccoon with an afro named Squiggles who shoots pixie dust from his bunghole".
- Rowling appears as a wrestler on Celebrity Deathmatch, where she uses Harry Potter-style spells against Stephen King. It ends when she kills Stephen King through a lightning bolt manifested from the power of Voldemort. However, after he dies, King's robotic leg acts up and ends up killing Rowling.
- On a couple of occasions, Craig Ferguson of The Late Late Show with Craig Ferguson has done a sketch where he portrays J.K. Rowling as a power-hungry, money-obsessed individual. Once he portrayed her doing a talk show, similar to Oprah, and advertising Harry Potter and the Deathly Hallows: "It really moved me... into a bigger mansion. HAHAHAHA! I'M RICH! I'M RICH!".
- In 2002, the Canadian newspaper National Post, in its satirical column Post Morten, wrote a spoof article claiming that:

"Rowling – or, as the article referred to and credited her, Mrs. J. K. Satan – said that as she sat in a coffee shop one grey day, wondering what to do with her empty, aimless life, it hit her: "I'll give myself, body and soul, to the Dark Master. And in return, he will give me absurd wealth and power over the weak and pitiful of the world. And he did!"

Like The Onion's article on Harry Potter and Satanism, this article too was copied into a chain letter and released as truth onto the web.

- In one episode of the second series of Tracey Ullman's State of the Union, Tracey Ullman parodies J.K. Rowling as bossy and very keen on keeping her creations copyrighted, for example, she believes a hobo is impersonating Hagrid.
- Author Maureen Johnson, has, on multiple occasions, parodied J. K. Rowling on her blog. She has described J. K. Rowling as a deranged, food-obsessed psycho who keeps Alan Rickman prisoner in her basement.
- Rowling's propensity to make statements about the series' canon after the publication of Deathly Hallows – most notably, Dumbledore's sexuality – have led to internet memes in which Rowling supposedly confirms outlandish theories regarding the series; one such parody, in which CollegeHumor writers Willie Muse and Amir Khan doctored screenshots of Rowling's tweets to imply she stated Professors Flitwick and Sprout had previously been in a relationship, was accidentally reprinted in a Hufflepuff-themed version of Philosopher's Stone.
- In 2019, a parody of Rowling was featured in the television film Island of Dreams by Harry Enfield, where she was played by Samantha Spiro.
