= The Missing White House Tapes =

Studio album by National Lampoon
- Released: 1974
- Genre: Comedy, Parody
- Label: Blue Thumb Records

National Lampoon chronology
National Lampoon's Lemmings	''The Missing White House Tapes ''	Official National Lampoon Stereo Test and Demonstration Record

Professional ratings
Review scores
Source	Rating
AllMusic	2/5 stars

The Missing White House Tapes is a comedy album released as a satiric commentary on the Watergate scandal and is a spin-off from National Lampoon magazine. The recording was produced by Irving Kirsch and Vic Dinnerstein. It was released as a single on Blue Thumb Records in 1973. It was expanded into an album, which was subsequently nominated for a Grammy Award as Best Comedy Recording of the year.

The single consists of a doctored speech, in which Richard Nixon confesses culpability in the Watergate break-in. Side One of the album contains additional doctored recordings of Nixon's speeches and press conferences. Side Two contains sketches performed by John Belushi, Chevy Chase, Rhonda Coullet, and Tony Scheuren.

== Tracks ==
SIDE ONE

1. Checkers
2. Calendar
3. Oval Office
4. President's Qualities
5. The New VP
6. Inspiration
7. Energy Crisis
8. Hearings
9. Send Money
10. Admission Speech (from the single)
11. Wrap Up

SIDE TWO

1. Introduction and Impeachment Parade
2. Pennsylvania Avenue
3. News
4. Plumber Commercial
5. Impeachment Day Parade Continued
6. The Constitution Game
7. News
8. Senate Hearings
9. Impeachment Day Parade Continued
10. Tooth Commercial
11. Mission Impeachable
12. News
13. The FBI
14. Impeachment, Swearing Out
15. The Gerry Ford Show
