= That's Not Funny, That's Sick (book) =

That's Not Funny, That's Sick: The National Lampoon and the Comedy Insurgents Who Captured the Mainstream
- Author: Ellin Stein
- Language: English
- Publisher: W. W. Norton & Company
- Publication date: June 2013
- Publication place: United States
- Media type: Print
- Pages: 447
- ISBN: 978-0-393-07409-3

That's Not Funny, That's Sick: The National Lampoon and the Comedy Insurgents Who Captured the Mainstream is a book by the journalist Ellin Stein, published by Norton in June 2013. Based on many interviews, the book is a history covering some of National Lampoon magazine's lifespan and that of some of its creators, starting with the original founders' time spent at The Harvard Lampoon, and ending in 1980 after the funeral of co-founder Doug Kenney.
