= Zany Afternoons =

Book by illustrator Bruce McCall

Zany Afternoons is a book containing a collection of some of illustrator Bruce McCall's best comic paintings to 1982. It was published by Knopf in that year and featured works that originally appeared mainly in National Lampoon. At 126 pages, the book includes written and illustrated material. Some of the pieces included in Zany Afternoons included:

- Soviet Mechnod-Foto Hello! - a parody of Soviet propaganda newspapers
- Wing Dining
- Pyramid Climber
- Rich People
- Bulgemobiles
- Tank Polo
- Zeppelin Shoots - "they fell so much more gracefully than grouse"
- RMS Tyrannic, The Biggest Thing In All The World
- Nazi Regalia for Gracious Living
- Huge Machines
- Major Howdy Bixby's Album of Forgotten War Birds - a parody of old-fashioned military planes, first published in Playboy magazine 1970
- New York, Once Upon a Time
- 1936 Cairo World's Fair
- That Fabulous Battle of Britain!
- My Own Stamp Album
- Swillmart Supplement & Other Glimpses of the Golden Age of Play
- The Adventures of the Hotel Throckmorton
