= Official National Lampoon Stereo Test and Demonstration Record =

Studio album by Ed Subitzky
- Released: 1974
- Genre: Comedy, Demonstration
- Label: National Lampoon
- Producer: Windy Craig

Ed Subitzky chronology
The Missing White House Tapes	Official National Lampoon Stereo Test and Demonstration Record	National Lampoon Gold Turkey

The Official National Lampoon Stereo Test and Demonstration Record is a comedy album released by National Lampoon in 1974, in vinyl LP format. The album is a parody of stereo test and demonstration records, which were used by hi-fi enthusiasts to test the performance of their audio systems. The tracks are titled as if they are normal audio test tracks, but in reality each one is a piece of sketch comedy. The album does, however, also function as a real stereo test recording. Included with the record is a 32-page booklet entitled The Official National Lampoon Hi-Fi Primer, which is a parody of a hi-fi glossary. It includes real advertisements from stereo equipment manufacturers.

The liner notes for the album, on the back of the sleeve, stand as a humor piece in their own right. After each section of liner notes, the reader is "required" to take a multiple-choice test to see if he/she has understood the material.

The album, liner notes, and booklet were conceived and written by Ed Subitzky. Windy Craig was the producer, and John Hechtman was the sound engineer. The album was voice acted by Subitzky, John Belushi, Chevy Chase and Emily Prager. It was narrated by Stan Sawyer.

== Related album ==
Six years later, in 1980, the related album, The Official National Lampoon Car Stereo Test & Demonstration Tape, also by Ed Subitzky, was released on cassette tape.

== Track listing ==
Side 1

1. Introduction to Side One
2. Test: Voice
3. Test: Balance
4. Demonstration: Several Parameters
5. Demonstration: Separation
6. Demonstration: Frequency Response
7. Test: Unmodulated Grooves
8. Special Service
9. Test: End of Side One

Side 2

1. Introduction to side 2
2. Test: Realism
3. Resistance Accuracy
4. Test: Phasing
5. Test: Exaggeration
6. Test: Listener
7. The Punishment Band
8. Conclusion
