= The Someday Funnies =

2011 comics anthology

- Author: Michel Choquette (Editor)
- Language: English
- Genre: Humor
- Publisher: Abrams Books
- Publication date: November 1st 2011
- Publication place: United States
- Media type: Print
- Pages: 216
- ISBN: 978-0-8109-9618-2

The Someday Funnies is an book of comics which was published by Abrams on November 1, 2011. The book was a project that had originally been intended as a special supplement for the magazine Rolling Stone, but this collection of comics about the 1960s rapidly grew too large to be used for that purpose.

The collection was started in the early 1970s, when the humorist Michel Choquette began soliciting work internationally from contemporary writers and artists, 169 of whom responded. Forty years later the book was finally published.

Of those who contributed pieces, many were already well known as cartoonists, but numerous others were leading creative figures of the 20th century in other fields. Pieces were created especially for the book by writers, artists, and composers including the writer William Burroughs, the filmmaker Federico Fellini, the writer Tom Wolfe, the musician Frank Zappa, founding Mad (magazine) cartoonists Harvey Kurtzman and Wallace Wood, the cartoonists Gahan Wilson and Ed Subitzky, the artist Red Grooms, and 160 others.
