= Michael Gerber (parodist) =

American novelist

Michael Gerber (born June 14, 1969) is best known as the author of the Barry Trotter series, a Sunday Times best-selling parody of the Harry Potter books. Before becoming a novelist, Gerber contributed humor to The Yale Record, The New Yorker, The Atlantic, The New York Times, The Wall Street Journal, Slate, NPR, and Saturday Night Live, among many other venues. He is an alumnus of Yale and Oak Park River Forest High School.

In October 2015, Gerber launched The American Bystander, an all-star print humor quarterly. The magazine was an immediate hit, garnering strongly positive reviews in The New York Times and Newsweek, which hailed Bystander as "the last great humor magazine." As of January 2020, Bystander's thirteen issues have raised over $290,000 via crowdfunding and subscriptions on Patreon. Gerber currently serves as editor and publisher, personally handling all aspects of the venture. This auteurist method is somewhat unique in publishing; Gerber refined and perfected it with Barry Trotter and his other large-scale parodies of the 90's and 2000's. In addition to providing an old-style closeness between editor and audience (as with Hugh Hefner and Stan Lee), its efficiency allows Bystander to pay its contributors.

A March 2019 column in The New York Times by Jennifer Finney Boylan lauded Gerber's "hard work and genius" as it detailed Bystander's long, strange path to publication. In early 1982, a full pilot issue was prepared by then-Editor Brian McConnachie and Managing Editor Boylan, but funding fell through before it could be distributed. Gerber referred to this test run as he prepared the 2015 edition, blending it with contemporary trends in comedy and design. Boylan wrote that the result is a "beautiful, hilarious magazine — very much what we always hoped the Bystander would become."

While an undergraduate, Gerber restarted The Yale Record, America's oldest humor magazine. Gerber served as president of The Record's alumni organization from 1994 to 2014, developing an editorial and publishing model for the magazine. As a result, he is frequently contacted by student editors from all around the world, and has most recently worked with students at DePaul University, Ohio State University, Cambridge University, and UCLA.

His humor novels have sold 1.2 million copies in 25 languages worldwide.

Before turning to comedy, Gerber considered a career as a historian specializing in the 1960s and 70s. In 2008, he, along with novelist/editor Ed Park and author Devin McKinney, launched the popular Beatles fan site Hey Dullblog. Gerber has run the site for over a decade, and it has become a well-loved source for intelligent if irreverent analysis of the group, its music, and the era.

== Bibliography ==
- Barry Trotter and the Shameless Parody (2002) ISBN 978-0-575-07454-5
- Barry Trotter and the Unnecessary Sequel (2003) ISBN 978-0-575-07558-0
- Barry Trotter and the Dead Horse (2004) ISBN 978-0-575-07630-3
- The Chronicles of Blarnia: The Lying Bitch in the Wardrobe (2005) ISBN 978-0-575-07816-1
- Freshman (2006) ISBN 978-0-7868-3850-9
- Sophomore (2006) ISBN 978-1-890470-03-6
- Our Kampf: Collected Humor 1989-2004 (2006) ISBN 978-1-890470-04-3
- A Christmas Peril (2008) ISBN 978-1-890470-05-0
- Life After Death for Beginners (2010) ISBN 978-1-890470-06-7
- Downturn Abbey (2012) ISBN 978-1-890470-10-4
- The American Bystander #1 (2015) ISBN 978-0692587171
- The American Bystander #2 (2016) ISBN 978-0692724064
- The American Bystander #3 (2016) ISBN 978-0692799550
- The American Bystander #4 (2017) ISBN 978-0692869123
- The American Bystander #5 (2017) ISBN 978-0692943892
- The American Bystander #6 (2017) ISBN 978-0692983072
- The American Bystander #7 (2018) ISBN 978-0692065853
- The American Bystander #8 (2018) ISBN 978-0692184332
- The American Bystander #9 (2018) ISBN 978-0578428734
- The American Bystander #10 (2019) ISBN 978-0578483979
- The American Bystander #11 (2019) ISBN 978-0578538020
- The American Bystander #12 (2019) ISBN 978-0578578439
- The American Bystander #13 (2019) ISBN 978-0578602028
- The American Bystander #14 (2020) ISBN 978-0578665689
