= Charles Barsotti =

American cartoonist

Charles Branum Barsotti
- Born: September 28, 1933; San Marcos, Texas
- Died: June 16, 2014 (aged 80); Kansas City, Missouri
- Spouse: Ramoth Barsotti

Charles Branum Barsotti (September 28, 1933 – June 16, 2014) was an American cartoonist who contributed gag cartoons to major magazines.

== Early life ==
Born in San Marcos, Texas in 1933, Barsotti grew up in San Antonio and graduated from Texas State University in 1955. He then served in the Army and worked at the Brown School in San Marcos which was a residential treatment center for people with special needs, whilst studying with the aim of obtaining a master's degree in education.

== Career as a cartoonist ==
Barsotti was the cartoon editor of The Saturday Evening Post and a staff cartoonist at The New Yorker beginning in 1970. His work also appeared in Playboy, Punch and Fast Company, among other publications. He was a signature artist whose rounded, elegant, sparsely detailed style evoked both the traditional world of a James Thurber and the contemporary sensibility of a Roz Chast.

Barsotti's work features a simple repertory including a nameless, lovable pooch and a monarch whose kingdom consists of a guard and a telephone.

His work in comic strips included:

- C. Barsotti's People
- My Kind of People
- P.J. McFey
- Sally Bananas (1969–1973)
- Funny Form (1974)
- Punchline: USA (1975)
- Broadsides (1975–1979)

In 1992, his dog character was adopted as a logo by the office supplies company Niceday Ltd, which was taken over the French company Guilbert, leading to the nickname "Niceday pup" in the United Kingdom. On February 26, 1996, the pup also appeared on one of three United Kingdom postage stamps featuring Barsotti's cartoons.

== Politics ==
Barsotti openly opposed the Vietnam War. In 1972, he ran for Congress as the Democratic nominee against incumbent Larry Winn in the third district of Johnson County, Kansas, but faced heavy Republican opposition and dropped out of the race. In a 1986 interview Barsotti said of his campaign:

It was a 'You can vote for me as a protest against the war if you want to' kind of thing. Roughly I got about 30 percent of the vote, and it's very rough because I tried to put all that behind me as quickly as possible. I love politics but I don't like politicians. This sounds awful, but you can't [be a politician] and be a cartoonist.

His entire campaign staff dropped him and became the Wyandotte County, Kansas City, Kansas staff for the McGovern campaign when Mr. Barsotti refused to do any campaign functions.

== Death ==
Barsotti died of brain cancer on June 16, 2014, at his home in Kansas City, Missouri, aged 80.

== Awards ==
Barsotti received the National Cartoonist Society's Gag Cartoon Award for 1988 for his work.

== Books ==
- A Girl Needs a Little Action (1969)
- Kings Don't Carry Money (August 1983)
- Barsotti's Texas (July 1986)
- The Essential Charles Barsotti (October 1, 1998)
- From the Very Big Desk of...: Business Cartoons by New Yorker Cartoonist Charles Barsotti (May 17, 2006)
- They Moved My Bowl: Dog Cartoons by New Yorker Cartoonist Charles Barsotti (May 15, 2007)
