= Michel Choquette =

Canadian humorist

Michel Choquette (born March 14, 1938) is a Canadian humorist who has written for print, for television and for film, and a comedian who has performed for television.

== Life and career ==
Choquette was born March 14, 1938, in Montreal, Quebec to a French Canadian family.

He attended Selwyn House School and did his undergraduate studies at Sir George Williams University. Afterwards, he studied for a master's degree in archaeology at the University of Pennsylvania, but did not graduate.

In 1959 he created a record called "Songs of Murray Bay", which made fun of a summer resort town on the St. Lawrence which was widely popular locally. Because of this song, Choquette, at age 22, caught the interest of Cambridge-based musical satirist Tom Lehrer.

Along with Peter Elbling, Choquette was half of the comedy duo "The Times Square Two" from 1964 to 1970.

Choquette wrote for the Harvard Lampoon, and for National Lampoon magazine, where he was a contributing editor from 1970 to 1971, an associate editor during 1972, and a contributing editor from 1973 to 1974.

During the 1970s, Choquette put together The Someday Funnies, a large collection of original comics about the 1960s that were created especially for the book by 169 writers and artists. The book was released by Abrams on November 1, 2011.

In 1979 he played the bilingual tourist in the short satirical film Twice Upon a Time... (Il était deux fois).

Choquette presently teaches screenwriting, comedy writing and creative writing at McGill University and Concordia University in Montreal.
