= Bruce McCall =

Canadian author and illustrator (1935–2023)

- Born: May 10, 1935; Simcoe, Ontario, Canada
- Died: May 5, 2023 (aged 87); New York City, U.S.
- Occupations: Author; Illustrator

Bruce McCall (May 10, 1935 – May 5, 2023) was a Canadian author and illustrator, best known for his frequent contributions to The New Yorker and the National Lampoon magazines. He published several collections of work, as well as two memoirs and a children's book.

== Life and career ==
McCall was born on May 10, 1935, in Simcoe, Ontario. He was fascinated by comic books and showed an early aptitude for drawing fantastical flying machines, blimps, bulbous-nosed muscle cars and futuristic dioramas. In his memoir, Thin Ice (1997), McCall recounted that he was never good at physical activity as a boy, but could count on his mother to encourage his creativity.

In the late 1950s, McCall began his illustration career in Toronto without any significant formal training, drawing cars for Ford Motor Company. His career later transitioned into advertising. In 1962, McCall started a job writing ad copy at the Campbell Ewald agency in Detroit, which was led by David E. Davis Jr., future editor in chief of Car and Driver and Automobile magazine founder. He later moved on to write ads for Ford and Mercedes-Benz at the agency Ogilvy, and temporarily relocated to Germany to lead advertising for Mercedes-Benz. He became the executive vice president and creative director of the McCall advertising agency (founded by an unrelated McCall) before he left in 1993 to pursue opportunities in publishing.

In 1972, McCall joined the National Lampoon, where his artwork became known for its intelligent and whimsical humor. For a brief period in the late 1970s, he wrote sketches for Saturday Night Live. A large proportion of McCall's work has a retrofuturistic theme. McCall's work regularly appeared in magazines such as Car and Driver and The New Yorker, where he started contributing in 1979. As a humorist, McCall frequently wrote essays for the New Yorker's "Shouts & Murmurs" section, and documented social ironies of modern life. He contributed more than 80 covers to the magazine over the course of his career.

McCall lived on the Upper West Side of Manhattan in New York City near Central Park with his wife, Polly, and daughter. On May 5, 2023, he died of complications from Parkinson's disease at Calvary Hospital in the Bronx. He was 87.

== Selected bibliography ==
=== Books ===
- (1982) Zany Afternoons ISBN 0-394-42683-5
- (1993) Sit!: The Dog Portraits of Thierry Poncelet, text by Bruce McCall ISBN 1-56305-380-2
- (1997) Thin Ice (memoir) ISBN 0-679-76959-5
- (1998) Viagra Nation: The Definitive Guide to Life in the New Sexual Utopia ISBN 0-06-019311-5
- (2001) Sit!: Ancestral Dog Portraits ISBN 0-7611-2544-2
- (2001) The Last Dream-o-Rama ISBN 0-609-60801-0
- (2003) New York to the World Mural 8th Ave and 34th street
- (2003) All Meat Looks Like South America ISBN 0-609-60802-9
- (2008) Marveltown ISBN 0-374-39925-5
- (2009) 50 Things to Do with a Book ISBN 0-06-170366-4
- (2013) This Land Was Made for You and Me (But Mostly Me): Billionaires in the Wild (with David Letterman) ISBN 0-399-16368-9
- (2020) How Did I Get Here? ISBN 9780399172281

=== Articles ===
- "Looking Forward to Your Check". Shouts & Murmurs. The New Yorker. 84 (44): 29. January 12, 2009.
- "Pet Books Proliferate". Shouts & Murmurs. The New Yorker. 87 (36): 43. November 14, 2011.
- "Know Your Coconuts". Sketchbook. The New Yorker. 93 (10): 60. April 24, 2017.
