= Trow (surname) =

Trow is a surname. Notable people with the surname include:

- Albert Howard Trow (1863–1939), Welsh botanist
- Ann Trow, American abortion care provider
- Bob Trow (1926–1998), American radio personality and actor
- Brian Trow, financier
- George W. S. Trow (1943–2006), American essayist, novelist, playwright, and media critic
- James Trow (1826–1892), Canadian businessman and politician
- John Fowler Trow (1810–1886), American printer and publisher
- Kristine Trow, American politician
- M. J. Trow (born 1949), Welsh writer

== See also ==
- Ernest Trow Carter, organist and composer
