= Trow (disambiguation) =

Trow was a type of cargo boat used in Great Britain.

Trow may also refer to:

- Trow (folklore), a troll-like creature from Shetland and Orkney Island folklore
- Trow (surname)
- Trow, Wisconsin, a ghost town
- Trow (Myth), a type of giant in the Myth series of video games
- The NASDAQ stock ticker for T. Rowe Price

== See also ==
- Throw (disambiguation)
