= New York City directories =

The New-York Directory, published in 1786, was the first extant directory for New York City and the third published in the United States. It listed 846 names. A year earlier, the first two in the country were published in Philadelphia – the first, compiled by Francis White, was initially printed October 27, 1785, and the second, compiled by John Macpherson (1726–1792), was initially printed November 22, 1785.

== Timeline and highlights ==
1624:
New Amsterdam, a 17th-century Dutch settlement established at the southern tip of Manhattan, in 1624, became a provincial extension of the Dutch Republic and was designated as the capital of the province in 1625.
1655:
Arguably, the first New York City directory was A Directory for the City of New York in 1665, a list of mostly Dutch householders, men and women, in New Amsterdam, arranged according to the streets they lived on.
1725:
As a milestone in publishing, the first newspaper in the State of New York, the New-York Gazette, was published on November 8, 1725, in Manhattan.
1752:
January 1, 1752 – calendar reform – the Gregorian calendar, intended to more accurately reflect a solar year, replaced the Julian calendar throughout Britain. The first day of a new year changed from March 25 to January 1. In doing so, the calendar dropped 11 days, beginning September 14, 1752, the date that immediately followed September 2. For dates prior to 1752, historians henceforth added 11 days. For example, George Washington's birthday – February 11 on a Julian calendar – became February 22.
1776:
July 4, 1776 – U.S. Declaration of Independence
1783:
September 3, 1783 – End of the American Revolutionary War
1786–1787:
The New York Directory (republished 1851 copy) was compiled and published by David Franks (né David Carroll Franks) and printed by Shepard Kollock (1750–1839). The listings are categorized by profession and appear in alphabetical order by first name. By coincidence, on page 63, the listing of Alexander Hamilton immediately follows that of Aaron Burr, who, on July 11, 1804, mortally wounded Hamilton in a duel – famously reenacted in the Broadway musical Hamilton.

Franks was an accountant and conveyancer. In 1788, he petitioned for relief from creditors due to insolvency.

1783:
Book of Negroes (§ Other directories and city references)

Sir Guy Carleton, who from 1782 to 1783 was Commander-in-Chief of all British forces in North America, kept careful records – names and descriptions of 3,000 Black Loyalists, most of whom had been freed in accordance with British proclamations. As Commander, in fulfilling the Crown's promise of freedom to slaves who joined the British during the Revolution, Carleton provided Washington with the list, which became known as the Book of Negroes. Of those listed, 2,800 were from New York City – 1,136 men, 914 women, and 750 children – most of whom were evacuated to points in Nova Scotia as free people of color. (related article: Black Nova Scotians)

1788:
No directory published.
1789–1790:
The New York Directory, and Register was published by Hodge, Allen & Campbell

Robert Hodge (1746–1813) (editor) immigrated to America from Edinburgh in 1770 and opened a printing office in New York in 1773.

Thomas Allen (1754–1826) (editor) was a bookseller in New York from 1786 to 1799. In 1789, he offered for sale the first Encyclopædia Britannica in America. Samuel Campbell (1765–1836) (editor) was born in Edinburgh, Scotland. He had been, from about 1785 to 1822, a bookseller in New York, his final location being at 124 Pearl Street.

His father, Samuel Campbell (1735–1813) acquired around 120 acres in Springfield, New Jersey (an area that has since become part of Millburn, New Jersey), about 16 miles from New York City, where he built a home and, in 1795, built The Thistle Paper Mill, the site on which, today, sits the Paper Mill Playhouse. Samuel Campbell, the son, married twice, to sisters – first, on December 14, 1886, to Eliza Duyckinck (1765–1798) – second, on July 24, 1799, to Euphame Duyckinck (1771–1847). Both were aunts of writers Evert Augustus Duyckinck (1816–1878) and George Long Duyckinck (1823–1863), who were brothers. Hodge, Allen, and Campbell, together, owned a bookstore, but Allen sold his interest to Hodge and Campbell in 1790. In 1792, Hodge and Campbell went their separate ways in bookselling – Hodge at 11 Water Street and Campbell at 37 Hanover Square. Campbell's brother, Robert (1767–1800) was a notable bookseller in Philadelphia. Robert is cited for having published texts that contributed to the American Enlightenment.

1790:
The first sidewalks were laid on Broadway, between Vesey and Murray Streets.
1791–1795:
The New-York Directory and Register published – William Duncan (–1795) (compiler); John McComb (1763–1853) (cartographer); Cornelius Tiebout (1777–1832) (engraver); T. & J. Swords (printer) (§ New York City (Manhattan) directories)

Thomas Swords (1763–1843) and James Swords (1765–1846), Albany-born brothers, founded and ran the firm in New York City from 1788 to 1832, when Thomas retired. A daughter of Thomas Swords, Elizabeth Davidson Swords (1804–1833), on June 8, 1824, in Manhattan, married John Evers (1797–1884), an artist and one of the founders of the National Academy of Design.

1796:
John Low (1763–1809)

John Buel (1768–1800) (Note: John Buel (1768–1800) was the founder and publisher of the Evening Mercury (New York). He founded it January 1, 1793, as a 4-page quarto and issued it weekdays, immediately after four o'clock. The last extant issue is January 3, 1793 (Vol. 1, No. 3). John Buel & Co. also launched the Columbian Gazetteer, which ran from 1793 to 1794 (final issue: November 13, 1794, Vol. 2, No. 130). The Columbian Gazetteer, was purchased by Levi Wayland, who, with Matthew Livingston Davis (de) (1773–1850), founded and edited The New-York Evening Post (first issue: November 26, 1794). (see Clarence S. Brigham, "Proceedings, 1917, in the Reference section)) (printer), corner of Water Street and Fly Market (in the 17th century, located at the bottom of Maiden Lane)

John Bull (Note: John Bull was, from 1795 to 1797, editor of the New York Weekly Magazine. He also printed: Camilla, a picture of youth (Vol. 1) (December 6, 1797) By Madame D'Arblay (late Miss Burney)) (printer), 115 Cherry Street (1795–1797); 407 Pearl Street (1797)

In 1796, John Low published his directory and in 1797, he established his bookstore in New York, called "Shakespeare's Head" at 332 Water Street, later, at 33 (1804–1808) and at 17 (1813–1819) Chatham Street (now known as Park Row), and after that, at 48 Vesey Street (around 1825). When John Low Sr. died, his wife, Esther Prentiss (maiden; 1762–1816), and sons, John Low Jr. (1790–1829), and Thomas P. Low (1795–1818), continued operating the bookstore. Other imprints from his firm were used, including "E. Low," which reflects the name of his wife, Esther. One of John Low's granddaughters, Elizabeth Hannah Remington (maiden, never married; 1826–1917), was, until about 1897, one of the best known pastel artists in the country.

1796–1817:
David Longworth (1765?–1821)

In 1805, Longworth's directory listed 291 shoemakers in New York City, second only to carpentry in total practitioners. Longworth's 1805 directory also listed a variety of men from other trades, including four each identified as bakers, carpenters, hairdressers, and tailors, three each as blacksmiths, butchers, printers, and sailmakers, and seventeen other crafts such as a wire-maker, stone-ware potter, a tin and copper worker, a venetian blind manufacturer, and a cooper. Only three non-skilled subscribers appeared: a cartman named Josiah Corrington and two laborers, Abraham Day, and Peter Winthrop. In a study of readership of The New-York Magazine, David Paul Nord found in a random sample of the 1790 New York Directory that shoemakers comprised 14.7 percent of the artisan population in New York City.

Directories compiled by David Longworth began referencing the United States calendar (aka National calendar), from July 4, 1776. For example, a book published today, 28 August 2026, would be expressed as "The two hundred and fiftieth Year of American Independence."

1804:
John Langdon and Son, 32 Vesey Street, grocers and directory makers (1804)

32 Vesey Street, office of Langdon's Early and Cheap Directory (1804) William W. Vermilye (1780–1849) (printer)

1811:
New York street grid system established (Commissioners' Plan of 1811)
1817–1842:
Thomas Longworth (1788–1855)

New York City directories, commencing with Longworth's 1832 edition, provides lists of newspapers published in New York City. (Mercein's city directory of 1820 also provides a list of newspapers in New York City).

1817–1842:
The last slaves in New York City were freed
Main article: History of slavery in New York
1835:
Great Fire of New York
1837:
Panic of 1837 (financial crisis)
1830–1840:
Edwin Williams (1797–1854) compiled two directories: (i) The New-York Annual Register (10 Volumes, from 1830 to 1845), and (ii) New-York As It Is (for about 3 years, beginning 1833).

One of his printers, Benjamin S. Collins (né Benjamin Say Collins; 1784–1857) – of Collins & Hannay – was a son of Isaac Collins, pioneering printer from New York City.

Benjamin S. Collins and Samuel Hannay were partners as booksellers from 1817 to 1831. Thereafter, the business continued by Hannay and George B. Collins (1807–1854), the only surviving son of Charles Collins (1774–1843), Benjamin's brother. Samuel Hannay had also been a corporate secretary for the Mutual Life Insurance Company of New York, chartered on April 12, 1842, by Alfred Pell and Morris Robinson (1784–1849) (president). Hannay died in 1849.

1833–18??:
New York As It Is, first published in 1833, was in 1848 the namesake of a New York musical (re: New York As It Is), written by Benjamin A. Baker (1818–1890) and produced by Frank S. Chanfrau (1824–1884) at the Chatham Theatre on Chatham Street (now Park Row), starring Frank Chanfrau and Mrs. Junius Brutus Booth.
1850–1855:
In 1842, the Croton Aqueduct was completed, which supplied fresh water to New York City.
1842–1849:
John Doggett Jr. (1807–1852)

1845: Doggett issued a supplement, needed because of the Great Fire of July 19, updating address changes.

One of his printers, Seth Williston Benedict (1803–1869), was an influential member of the American and Foreign Anti-Slavery Society, for whom he published The Emancipator (1835: New York) and other publications.

1850–1855:
In 1849, after years of haphazard planning and a series of deadly cholera outbreaks in other countries, New York City started systematically building sewers. Between 1850 and 1855, New York laid 70 miles of sewers.
See:
1846–1860 cholera pandemic (global)
1854 Broad Street cholera outbreak (London)
High Bridge (New York City)
1850–1851:
Charles Rudolph Rode (1825–1865), of Doggett & Rode
1852–1870:
John F. Trow (1810–1886)

(§ New York City (Manhattan) directories)
(§ Great Metropolis directories)
(§ Copartnership directories)
(§ Business directories)

Henry Wilson, compiler of the earlier Trow directories, was a bookseller and publisher of The Book Trade. His business address in 1852 was at 49 Ann Street. The 1879 Trow directory stated that Henry Wilson had no connection to the directory.

1859:
John Christopher Gobright (né Gobrecht) of Baltimore began publishing The New-York Sketch Book; and Merchants' Guide. He and John W. Torsch (1834–1898), also of Baltimore, earlier, in 1857, began publishing The Baltimore Illustrated Times and Local Gazette.

(§ Business directories)

White, Orr and Company, the principals being James H. White, John F. White, Michael White (brothers), and William B. Orr, allegedly purchased the Phillips directories business. But the three brothers and Orr were indicted by a New York County grand jury and arrested on December 30, 1921, on charges of grand larceny (or second degree larceny) for collecting advertising fees for directories never published, other than the two published. The alleged amount that they swindled reached four million dollars.

(§ The Reference registers)

Spurious names of business directories, nationally, under which defendants allegedly conducted fraudulent collections included:

- Randall's Commercial Register
- Lockwood's Reference Directory
- Cushing's Directory
- Livermore's Lexicon of Financial Firms
- Howard's Handy Guide
- Lloyd's Industrial Record
- Parker's Annual Business Manual
- McMillan's List of Manufacturers
- Norcross Reference Book
- Plymouth List of Jobbers (see jobber)
- Odell's Official Directory

Similar attempts to fraudulently collect were common, even with Wilson's Directory.

1861:
For east-west cross streets on the grid system, Manhattan adopted the decimal system. Each block between two major avenues were assigned address numbers in increments of 100. The addresses on blocks between Fifth and Sixth Avenues, for example, took numbers 1 through 99 – between Sixth and Seventh Avenues, 100 through 199; and so on. Note that this did not unify address numbers for the avenues.
1865:
New York City draft riots
1865:
End of the American Civil War
1870:
Woolf Phillips (died 1916) began publishing the Phillips' Business Directory of New York City. In 1874, he began publishing Phillips' Élite Directory in the style of the Royal Court Guide of London.

Woolf Phillips was a brother of Morris Phillips (1834–1904), who had been associated with the poet, Nathaniel Parker Willis (1806–1867), as associate editor of the New York Home Journal from September 1854, until Willis' death, then became chief editor and sole proprietor. Morris Phillips, in America, became known as "the father of society news."

One of the printers for Phillips, Frank Denham Harmon (1850–1907), had been married to Mary Eloise Burr (1856–1899), whose great-grandmother, Hannah Burr (née Edwards; 1723–1803) was a sister of Jonathan Edwards (1703–1758), the third president (in 1758) of Princeton. Princeton's second president (from 1748 to 1757), Aaron Burr Sr. (1716–1757), was a son-in-law, by way of marriage to Esther Edwards (maiden; 1732–1758), of Jonathan Edwards. Aaron Burr Sr., was also the father of Aaron Burr Jr. (1756–1836).

1871–1886:
The Trow City Directory Company, John F. Trow, Vice President

In 1877, James Collis Jr. (1828–1898), vice president and shareholder of The Trow City Directory Company, filed a lawsuit against John F. Trow, shareholder and treasurer, and Edward P. Beach, shareholder and president. Beach was also a general railway agent for the Grand Trunk Railway, the Detroit, Grand Haven and Milwaukee Railway, and the Great Western Railway.

John Libby was, in 1890, one of the four buyers of the block between 28th and 29th Streets and 14th and 15th Avenues in the Beechhurst neighborhood of Queens. This block was originally settled by employees of the Trow City Directory Company and was called for many years the "Trow Settlement." The house which was originally the Libby home, on the corner of 14th Avenue and 28thy Street, was later owned by Mrs. Charlotte Phayre.

1874:
The section of the Bronx west of the Bronx River was annexed to the City and the County of New York and was known as the Annexed District.
1878:
The first New York City telephone directory was issued October 23, 1878, by Bell Telephone Company of New York. It was printed on cardboard and could fit in a vest pocket. It listed 252 names, of which, only 17 were residential – ten in Manhattan and five in Brooklyn.
1883:
The Brooklyn Bridge, connecting Manhattan and Brooklyn, opened.
1888:
During the Gilded Age, the Social Register was copyrighted by the Social Register Association. The first volume appeared for New York City in 1888. There were less than two thousand families listed.
1889:
The Tower Building, arguably New York City's first skyscraper, was completed.
1898:
On January 1, 1898, New York City absorbed East Bronx, Brooklyn, western Queens County, and Staten Island.
1904:
The first underground line of the subway opened on October 27, 1904, almost 36 years after the opening of the first elevated line in New York City, which became the IRT Ninth Avenue Line.
Main article: History of the New York City Subway
1905:
Winthrop Press re-printed the 1786 directory. John Henry Eggers (1861–1944) founder and president of Winthrop. Eggers was the father of World War I hero Alan Louis Eggers.
1905:
Samuel DeWitt Styles (1841–1910) and Alexander Cash (1839–1910), printers of the Union League Club publications, were brothers-in-law. Cash, in 1866, married Sam Styles's sister, Sarah Catharine Styles (1843–1906). Cash also was a maternal uncle of architect George Oakley Totten Jr., who, in 1921, married Swedish-born sculptor Vicken von Post.

(§ Society directories, including social registers)

1911:
Triangle Shirtwaist Factory fire
(March 25, 1911)
1911:
The 1911–1912 edition of the Directory of Directors in the City of New York (§ Directories of directors) shows railway executive William C. Brown (né William Carlos Brown; 1853–1924) in 95 companies (railway subsidiaries) and J.P. Morgan in 65.
1928:
Penicillin, the first antibiotic, was discovered

== Selected New York City (Manhattan) directories (online) ==
=== New York City (Manhattan) directories ===
Year	Title	Printer	Compiler(s)	Google Books	HathiTrust	Internet Archive	Other
1786	New-York Directory (The)	David C. Franks	Shepard Kollock			Internet Archive	
1786	New-York Directory (The) (1874 reprint)	David C. Franks (original printer); Franklin Bayard Patterson (1848–1916) (re-printer)	Shepard Kollock	Cornell	Chicago	Cornell	
1786	New-York Directory (The) (1905 reprint)	David C. Franks (original printer); H. J. Sachs & Company (re-publisher) (Harry J. Sachs); Winthrop Press (re-printer) (John H. Eggers; died 1844; President)	Shepard Kollock	Google Books			
1786	New-York Directory (The) (reprint by Trow)	David C. Franks (original printer); The Trow City Directory Company (re-printer)	Shepard Kollock		HathiTrust; HathiTrust; HathiTrust	Internet Archive; Internet Archive	
1786	New-York Directory (The) (1851 reprint by Doggett)	David C. Franks (original printer); John Doggett Jr. (re-printer)	Shepard Kollock	Harvard; Michigan			
1787	New-York Directory (The)	David C. Franks	Shepard Kollock				
1788	(no directory published)						
1794	New-York Directory and Register (The)	T. & J. Swords	William Duncan		HathiTrust	Internet Archive	
1796	New-York Directory and Register (The)	John Buel (1768–1800); John Bull	John Low			New York; Brooklyn	NYPL
1797	Longworth's American Almanack, New-York Register, and City Directory (Twenty-second Year of American Independence)	T. & J. Swords	David Longworth				NYPL
1798	Longworth's American Almanack, New-York Register, and City Directory (Twenty-third Year of American Independence)	T. & J. Swords	David Longworth			ACPL (this copy many have belonged to John Langdon)	
1799	Longworth's American Almanack, New-York Register, and City Directory (Twenty-fourth Year of American Independence)	John C. Totton and Co.	David Longworth				NYPL
1801	Longworth's American Almanac, New-York Register, and City Directory (Twenty-sixth Year of American Independence)	David Longworth (printer & publisher); Shakespeare Gallery	David Longworth			Internet Archive	NYPL
1808	Longworth's American Almanac, New-York Register, and City Directory (Thirty-third Year of American Independence)	Shakespeare Gallery	David Longworth	Google Books	HathiTrust		
1811	Elliot & Crissy's New-York Directory, For the Year 1811, and 36th of the Independence of the U. States of America	Elliot & Crissy (printer & publisher)	William Elliot (1773–1837); James Crissy (1782–1867)		HathiTrust		NYPL
1812	Longworth's American Almanac, New-York Register, and City Directory (Thirty-seventh Year of American Independence)	Shakespeare Gallery	David Longworth			Internet Archive	
1814	Longworth's American Almanac, New-York Register, and City Directory (Thirty-ninth Year of American Independence)	David Longworth	David Longworth	Google Books			
1815	Longworth's American Almanac, New-York Register, and City Directory (Fortieth Year of American Independence)	Shakespeare Gallery	David Longworth			Internet Archive	
1817	Longworth's American Almanac, New-York Register, and City Directory (Fortieth-second Year of American Independence)	Shakespeare Gallery	David Longworth			Internet Archive	
1820	Mercein's City Directory, New-York Register, and Almanac	William A. Mercein (publisher & printer)	William A. Mercein (1789–1847)			Internet Archive	
1822	Longworth's American Almanac, New-York Register, and City Directory (Forty-seventh Year of American Independence)	Thomas Longworth (publisher); William Grattan (printer)	Thomas Longworth	Google Books			
1823	Longworth's American Almanac, New-York Register, and City Directory (Forty-eighth Year of American Independence)	Thomas Longworth (publisher); William Grattan (printer)	Thomas Longworth	Google Books			
1826	Longworth's American Almanac, New-York Register, and City Directory (Fifty-first Year of American Independence)	Thomas Longworth	Thomas Longworth			Internet Archive	
1827	Longworth's American Almanac, New-York Register, and City Directory (Fifty-second Year of American Independence)	Thomas Longworth	Thomas Longworth	Google Books	HathiTrust	Internet Archive (t.p. missing)	
1829	Longworth's American Almanac, New-York Register, and City Directory (Fifty-fourth Year of American Independence)	Thomas Longworth	Thomas Longworth	Google Books			
1832	Longworth's American Almanac, New-York Register, and City Directory (Fifty-seventh Year of American Independence)	Thomas Longworth	Thomas Longworth	Google Books; Google Books			
1834	Longworth's American Almanac, New-York Register, and City Directory (Fifty-ninth Year of American Independence)	Thomas Longworth	Thomas Longworth	Google Books; Google Books; Google Books	HathiTrust		
1835	Longworth's American Almanac, New-York Register, and City Directory (Sixtieth Year of American Independence)	Thomas Longworth	Thomas Longworth	Google Books; Google Books			
1836	Longworth's American Almanac, New-York Register, and City Directory (Sixty-first Year of American Independence)	Thomas Longworth	Thomas Longworth	Google Books		Internet Archive	
1837	Longworth's American Almanac, New-York Register, and City Directory (Sixty-second Year of American Independence)	Thomas Longworth	Thomas Longworth	Google Books			
1838	Longworth's American Almanac, New-York Register, and City Directory (Sixty-third Year of American Independence)	Thomas Longworth	Thomas Longworth	Google Books			
1839	Longworth's American Almanac, New-York Register, and City Directory (Sixty-fourth Year of American Independence)	Thomas Longworth	Thomas Longworth	Google Books		Internet Archive; Internet Archive	
1841	Longworth's American Almanac, New-York Register, and City Directory (Sixty-sixth Year of American Independence)	Thomas Longworth	Thomas Longworth	Google Books			
1842	Longworth's American Almanac, New-York Register, and City Directory Sixty-seventh Year of American Independence)	Thomas Longworth	Thomas Longworth	Google Books	HathiTrust		
1842–1843	New York City Directory, The	John Doggett Jr. (publisher); George W. Wood & Co. (printer)	John Doggett Jr.	Google Books			
1843–1844	New York City Directory, The (Vol. 2)		John Doggett		HathiTrust		
1844–1845	New York City Directory, The (Vol. 3)	John Doggett Jr. (publisher); H. Ludwig (printer)	John Doggett Jr.		HathiTrust		
1845–1846	New York City Directory, The (Vol. 4)	John Doggett Jr.	John Doggett Jr.	Google Books		Internet Archive	
1845–1846	New York City Directory, The (supplement to the 1845–1846 directory)	John Doggett Jr.	John Doggett Jr.	Google Books			
1846–1847	New York City Directory, The (Vol. 5)	John Doggett Jr. (publisher); H. Ludwig (printer)	John Doggett Jr.	Google Books		Internet Archive	
1847–1848	New York City Directory, The (Vol. 6)	John Doggett Jr. (publisher); H. Ludwig (printer)	John Doggett Jr.	Google Books		Internet Archive	
1848–1849	New York City Directory, The (Vol. 7)	John Doggett Jr. (publisher); H. Ludwig (printer)	John Doggett Jr.	Princeton; Chicago		Internet Archive	
1849–1850	New York City Directory, The (Vol. 8)		John Doggett		HathiTrust		
1850–1851	New York City Directory, The (Vol. 9)		John Doggett		HathiTrust		
1851–1852	New-York City Directory, The (Vol. 10)	Alfred Cobb (printer); Erza M. Grossman & Son; Adams Power Presses	John Doggett Jr. (1807–1852); Charles Rudolph Rode (1825–1865)	Google Books	HathiTrust		
1852–1853	New York City Directory, The (Vol. 11)		John Doggett Jr. (1807–1852); Charles Rudolph Rode (1825–1865)		HathiTrust		
1852–1853	[Trow's] Directory of the City of New-York (Vol. 11)	John F. Trow (printer & publisher)	Henry Wilson	Chicago	Chicago		
1853–1854	Trow's Directory of the City of New-York (Vol. 12)	John F. Trow (printer & publisher)	Henry Wilson		Harvard		
1854–1855	New York City Directory, The (Vol. 13)	James Moulton (printer)	Late John Doggett, Jr. (1807–1852); Charles Rudolph Rode (1825–1865)			Columbia	NYPL
1855–1856	Trow's New York City Directory (Vol. 69)	John F. Trow (printer & publisher)	Henry Wilson		Harvard		
1856–1857	Trow's New York City Directory (Vol. 70)	John F. Trow (printer & publisher)	Henry Wilson	Harvard		Columbia	
1857–1858	Trow's New York City Directory (Vol. 71)						NYPL
1858–1859	Trow's New York City Directory (Vol. 72)	John F. Trow (printer & publisher)	Henry Wilson	Harvard			
1859	Carroll's New York City Directory	Carroll & Company, Publisher	G. Danielson Carroll (George Danielson Carroll)	NYPL	Columbia; NYPL	Columbia	
1859–1860	Trow's New York City Directory (Vol. 73)	John F. Trow (printer & publisher)	Henry Wilson	Harvard	Harvard	Columbia (no title page)	
1860–1861	Trow's New York City Directory (Vol. 74)	John F. Trow (printer & publisher)	Henry Wilson	Harvard			
1861–1862	Trow's New York City Directory (Vol. 75)	John F. Trow (printer & publisher)	Henry Wilson	Harvard			
1862–1863	Trow's New York City Directory (Vol. 76) (no title page)	John F. Trow (printer & publisher)	Henry Wilson			Columbia (no title page)	
1863–1864	Trow's New York City Directory (Vol. 77)						NYPL
1864–1865	Trow's New York City Directory (Vol. 78)	John F. Trow (printer & publisher)	Henry Wilson	Harvard		Harvard	
1865–1866	Trow's New York City Directory (Vol. 79)						NYPL
1866–1867	Trow's New York City Directory (Vol. 80)					NYPL	NYPL
1867–1868	Trow's New York City Directory (Vol. 81)						
1868–1869	Trow's New York City Directory (Vol. 82)						NYPL
1869–1870	Trow's New York City Directory (Vol. 83)						NYPL
1870–1871	Trow's New York City Directory (Vol. 84)	John F. Trow (Publisher)	Henry Wilson				NYPL
1871–1872	Trow's New York City Directory (Vol. 85)	John F. Trow (publisher); Trow City Directory Company, The (publisher); New York Printing Company, The (printer)	Henry Wilson	Harvard			
1872–1873	Trow's New York City Directory (Vol. 86)	John F. Trow (publisher); Trow City Directory Company, The (publisher); New York Printing Company, The (printer)	Compiler: Henry Wilson; Associate compilers: James Collis Jr. (1828–1898); Robert Benjamin Hallock (1837–1880)		Harvard (t.p. missing)		
1873–1874	Trow's New York City Directory (Vol. 87)	John F. Trow (publisher); Trow City Directory Company, The (publisher); New York Printing Company, The (printer)	Compiler: Henry Wilson; Associate compilers: James Collis Jr. (1828–1898); Robert Benjamin Hallock (1837–1880)		HathiTrust (t.p. missing)		
1875	Goulding's New York City Directory (Vol. 1)	J.J. Little & Company (printer)	Lawrence G. Goulding (1854–1910)				
1876–1877	Trow's New York City Directory (Vol. 90)	John F. Trow (publisher); Trow City Directory Company, The (publisher); John F. Trow & Son (printer)	Compiler: Henry Wilson; Associate compilers: James Collis Jr. (1828–1898); Robert Benjamin Hallock (1837–1880)	Michigan	HathiTrust; HathiTrust	Internet Archive	NYPL
1877–1878	Goulding's New York City Directory (Vol. 3)	Lawrence G. Goulding & Co. (publisher)	Lawrence G. Goulding (1854–1910)	Harvard; Harvard			
1878–1879	Trow's New York City Directory (Vol. 92)	Trow City Directory Company, The (publisher); Trow's Printing and Bookbinding Co. (printer)		Harvard			
1879–1880	Trow's New York City Directory (Vol. 93)	Trow City Directory Company, The; Trow's Printing and Bookbinding Co.					NYPL
1880–1881	Trow's New York City Directory (Vol. 94)	Trow City Directory Company, The; Trow's Printing and Bookbinding Co.		Michigan			NYPL
1886–1887	Trow's New York City Directory (Vol. 100)	Trow City Directory Company, The; Trow's Printing and Bookbinding Co.		Michigan			
1893–1894	Trow's New York City Directory (Vol. 107)	Trow City Directory Company, The; Trow's Printing and Bookbinding Co.		Michigan			
1896–1897	Trow's New York City Directory (Vol. 110)	Trow City Directory Company, The; Trow's Printing and Bookbinding Co.		U. Michigan			
1899–1900	Trow's General Directory of the Boroughs of Manhattan and Bronx (Vol. 113)	Trow Directory, Printing and Bookbinding Company					NYPL
1900–1901	Trow's General Directory of the Boroughs of Manhattan and Bronx (Vol. 114)	Trow Directory, Printing and Bookbinding Company		Google Books			
1903–1904	Trow's General Directory of the Boroughs of Manhattan and Bronx (Vol. 117)	Trow Directory, Printing and Bookbinding Company				ACPL; Part 1 Part 2 Part 3	
1904–1905	Trow's General Directory of the Boroughs of Manhattan and Bronx (Vol. 118)	Trow Directory, Printing and Bookbinding Company				ACPL; Part 1 Part 2 Part 3	
1905–1906	Trow's General Directory of the Boroughs of Manhattan and Bronx (Vol. 119)	Trow Directory, Printing and Bookbinding Company				ACPL; Part 1 Part 2 Part 3	
1906–1907	Trow's General Directory of the Boroughs of Manhattan and Bronx (Vol. 120)	Trow Directory, Printing and Bookbinding Company				ACPL; Part 1 Part 2 Part 3	
1907–1908	Trow's General Directory of the Boroughs of Manhattan and Bronx (Vol. 121)	Trow Directory, Printing and Bookbinding Company				ACPL; Part 1 Part 2 Part 3	
1908–1909	Trow's General Directory of the Boroughs of Manhattan and Bronx (Vol. 122)	Trow Directory, Printing and Bookbinding Company				ACPL; Part 1 Part 2 Part 3	
1909–1910	Trow's General Directory of the Boroughs of Manhattan and Bronx (Vol. 123)	Trow Directory, Printing and Bookbinding Company		Google Books		ACPL; Part 1 Part 2 Part 3	
1910–1911	Trow's General Directory of the Boroughs of Manhattan and Bronx (Vol. 124)	Trow Directory, Printing and Bookbinding Company				ACPL; Part 1 Part 2 Part 3	
1911–1912	Trow's General Directory of the Boroughs of Manhattan and Bronx (Vol. 125)	Trow Directory, Printing and Bookbinding Company				ACPL; Part 1 Part 2 Part 3	
1912–1913	Trow's General Directory of the Boroughs of Manhattan and Bronx (Vol. 126)	Trow Directory, Printing and Bookbinding Company				ACPL; Part 1 Part 2 Part 3	
1913–1914	Trow's General Directory of the Boroughs of Manhattan and Bronx (Vol. 127)	Trow Directory, Printing & Bookbinding Co. (publisher)				ACPL; Part 1 Part 2 Part 3	
1914–1915	R.L. Polk & Co.'s 1915 Trow General Directory of New York City Embracing the Boroughs of Manhattan and The Bronx (Vol. 128)	R.L. Polk & Co. (publisher); Trow Press (printer)	R.L. Polk & Co. (compiler)		Illinois	Illinois	NYPL
1915–1916	R.L. Polk & Co.'s 1916 Trow General Directory of New York City Embracing the Boroughs of Manhattan and The Bronx (Vol. 129)	R.L. Polk & Co. (publisher)	R.L. Polk & Co. (compiler); Trow Press (printer)	Illinois	HathiTrust		NYPL
1916–1917	R.L. Polk & Co.'s 1917 Trow General Directory of New York City Embracing the Boroughs of Manhattan and The Bronx (Vol. 130)	R.L. Polk & Co. (publisher)	R.L. Polk & Co. (compiler); Trow Press (printer)			ACPL (no title page)	NYPL
1917–1918	R.L. Polk & Co.'s 1918 Trow General Directory of New York City Embracing the Boroughs of Manhattan and The Bronx (Vol. 131)	R.L. Polk & Co. (publisher)	R.L. Polk & Co. (compiler)				NYPL
1918–1919	(no directory published)						
1919–1920	(no directory published)						
1920–1921	R.L. Polk & Co.'s 1921 Trow General Directory of New York City Embracing the Boroughs of Manhattan and The Bronx (Vol. 132)	R.L. Polk & Co. (publisher)	R.L. Polk & Co. (compiler)				NYPL
1922–1923	R.L. Polk & Co.'s Trow General Directory of New York City Embracing the Boroughs of Manhattan and The Bronx (Vol. 133)	R.L. Polk & Co. (publisher)	R.L. Polk & Co. (compiler)			ACPL; Part 1 Part 2	
1931	New York City (Manhattan and Bronx) Residential Directory and Advertisers' Classified Section, 1931	Manhattan and Bronx Directory Publishing Co. (publisher)					NYPL

=== Great Metropolis directories ===
Year	Title	Printer	Compiler(s)	Google Books	HathiTrust	Internet Archive	Other
1845	The Great Metropolis: Or New York in 1845 (Vol. 1)	John Doggett Jr. (publisher)			Columbia	Columbia	
1845	The Great Metropolis: Or New York in 1845 (2nd ed.) (Vol. 1)	John Doggett Jr. (publisher); S.W. Benedict & Co. (Seth Williston Benedict; 1803–1869) (printer & stereotyper)		Harvard	Harvard		
1846	The Great Metropolis; Or Guide to New-York for 1846 (Vol. 2)	John Doggett Jr. (publisher); H. Ludwig (printer)		Princeton; Harvard	Minnesota; Princeton		
1848	The Great Metropolis; Or Guide to New-York for 1848 (Vol. 4)	H. Wilson (agent); H. Ludwig (printer)		Bavaria			
1849	The Great Metropolis; Or New-York Almanac for 1849 (Vol. 5)	Leavitt, Trow & Co. (printers); Henry Wilson (publisher)		NYPL	NYPL		
1850	The Great Metropolis; Or New-York Almanac for 1850 (Vol. 6)	John F. Trow (printer & stereotyper); Henry Wilson (publisher)			NYPL		
1851	The Great Metropolis; Or New-York Almanac for 1851 (Vol. 7)	John F. Trow (printer & stereotyper); Henry Wilson (publisher)				Columbia	
1854	The Great Metropolis; Or New-York Almanac for 1854 (Vol. 10)	John F. Trow (printer & stereotyper); Henry Wilson (publisher)			NYPL		

=== Business directories ===
Year	Title	Printer	Compiler(s)	Google Books	HathiTrust	Internet Archive	Other
1805	Jone's New-York Mercantile and General Directory (30th Year of American Independence)	Southwick & Hardcastle (printer) (Henry C. Southwick) (John Hardcastle)	John F. Jones			Internet Archive (this copy once belonged to John Ahern)	
1840	A.E. Wright's Boston, New York, Philadelphia & Baltimore Commercial Directory, and General Advertising Medium	A.E. Wright (publisher)		Google Books	HathiTrust		
1841	A.E. Wright's Boston, New York, Philadelphia & Baltimore Commercial Directory, and General Advertising Medium	A.E. Wright (publisher)			HathiTrust		
1845	Sheldon's & Co.'s Business or Advertising Directory Containing the Cards, Circulars, and Advertisements of the Principal Firms of the Cities of New-York, Boston, Philadelphia, and Baltimore, &c., &c.	John F. Trow & Company (printer)	M.L. Sheldon		HathiTrust		
1847	United States Statistical Directory, or Merchant's and Traveller's Guide; With a Wholesale Business Directory of New York	G.F. Nesbitt, Stationer and Printer (printer & publisher) (George F. Nesbitt; 1809–1869)	J.V. Loomis & Co. (Josiah Vail Loomis; born 1811)	Harvard	HathiTrust		
1852	Wilson's Business Directory of New York City	John F. Trow (publisher and printer)	Henry Wilson			Internet Archive	
1853	Wilson's Business Directory of New York City	John F. Trow (publisher and printer)	Henry Wilson	U. Chicago			
1856	Wilson's Business Directory of New York City	John F. Trow (publisher and printer)	Henry Wilson			Internet Archive	
1858	Wilson's Business Directory of New York City	John F. Trow (publisher and printer)	Henry Wilson	U. Wisconsin, Madison			
1859	The New-York Sketch Book, and Merchants' Guide (general edition)	J.C. Gobright & Co. (publisher)	John Christopher Gobright (compilers)	Google Books	HathiTrust		
1860	Union Sketch-Book (The): A reliable guide, exhibiting the history and business resources of the leading mercantile and manufacturing firms of New York To which is added, A Hand Book, for the use of visiting merchants	Pudney & Russell (publisher) (Andrew L. Pudney; 1808–1884) (Joseph Russell)	Gobright & Pratt (compilers) (John Christopher Gobright)	Google Books			
1861	Union Sketch-Book (The): A reliable guide, exhibiting the history and business resources of the leading mercantile and manufacturing firms of New York To which is added, A Directory	Rudd & Carleton (Edward Payson Rudd; 1833–1861) (George W. Carleton; 1832–1901)	Gobright and Dawes (compilers) (John Christopher Gobright)		HathiTrust		Don's List
1865	Wilson's Business Directory of New York City	John F. Trow (publisher and printer)	Henry Wilson	U. Chicago			
1866–1967	Merchant's Directory, The	J. Hartford & Co. (publisher and printer)			HathiTrust		
1874	Wilson's Business Directory of New York City; New York City Commercial Register (Vol. 27)	Trow City Directory Company, The (publisher); John F. Trow & Son (printer)	Henry Wilson			Internet Archive	
1874	New York Business Directory	Smythe & Wilcox (proprietors)			HathiTrust		
1875	Goulding's Business Directory of New York, Newark, Patterson, Jersey City and Hoboken (Vol. 7)	Lawrence G. Goulding (publisher)	Lawrence G. Goulding (1854–1910)			Part 1 Part 2	
1877	Rand's New York City Business Directory for 1877	Walter Heugh & Co. (publisher and printer)		Harvard	HathiTrust		
1878	Wilson's Business Directory of New York City – New York City Commercial Register (Vol. 31)	John F. Trow (publisher and printer)	Henry Wilson	Harvard			
1881	Phillips' Business Directory of New York City (Vol. 11)	W. Phillips & Co. (publisher) (Wolfe "Woolf" Phillips)	Julius William Hartz (1847–1907)			Internet Archive	
1882	Phillips' Business Directory of New York City (Vol. 12)	W. Phillips & Co. (publisher) (Wolfe "Woolf" Phillips)	Julius William Hartz (1847–1907)			Internet Archive	
1883	Phillips' Business Directory of New York City (Vol. 13)	W. Phillips & Co. (publisher) (Wolfe "Woolf" Phillips)	Julius William Hartz (1847–1907)			Internet Archive	
1885	The Trow City Directory Co's., Formerly Wilson's, Business Directory of New York City (Vol. 38)	Trow City Directory Company, The (publisher); Trow's Printing and Bookbinding Company (printer)				Internet Archive	
1886	Business Directory of New York City and Newark City, N.J.	American Reporter Co., The (Limited) (publisher)	Hugh A. Curtin (1843–1911)			Internet Archive	
1888	Business Directory of New York City, Brooklyn, and Newark	Hugh A. Curtin (1843–1911)	Hugh A. Curtin (1843–1911)			Internet Archive	
1890	The Trow City Directory Co.'s Business Directory of New York City (Vol. 43)	Trow City Directory Company, The (publisher); Trow's Printing and Bookbinding Company (printer)		U. Wisconsin, Madison			
1898	Trow's Business Directory of the Boroughs of Manhattan and The Bronx (Vol. 51)	Trow Directory, Printing & Bookbinding Co. (publisher)		Google Books	HathiTrust		
1913	Trow Business Directory of the Boroughs of Manhattan and The Bronx (Vol. 66)	Trow Directory, Printing & Bookbinding Co. (publisher)				ACPL; Part 1 of 3 Part 2 of 3 Part 3 of 3	

=== Copartnership directories ===
Year	Title	Printer	Compiler(s)	Google Books	HathiTrust	Internet Archive	Other
1843–1844	New-York City and Co-partnership Directory, The	John Doggett Jr. (publisher); H. Ludwig (printer)	John Doggett Jr.	Google Books; Google Books	HathiTrust		
1864–1865	Wilson's New York City Copartnership Directory	John F. Trow (publisher and printer)	Henry Wilson		HathiTrust		
1866–1867	Wilson's New York City Copartnership Directory	John F. Trow (publisher and printer)	Henry Wilson		HathiTrust		
1868–1869	Wilson's New York City Copartnership Directory	John F. Trow (publisher and printer)	Henry Wilson	Google Books	HathiTrust		
1874	Wilson's New York City Copartnership Directory (Vol. 22)	John F. Trow (publisher); Trow City Directory Company, The (publisher); John F. Trow & Son (printer)	Compiler: Henry Wilson; Associate compilers: James Collis Jr. (1828–1898); Robert Benjamin Hallock (1837–1880)	Google Books	HathiTrust		
1876	Wilson's New York City Copartnership Directory (Vol. 24)	John F. Trow (publisher); Trow City Directory Company, The (publisher); John F. Trow & Son (printer)	Compiler: Henry Wilson; Associate compilers: James Collis Jr. (1828–1898); Robert Benjamin Hallock (1837–1880)	Google Books			
1878	Wilson's New York City Copartnership Directory (Vol. 26)	John F. Trow (publisher and printer)			HathiTrust		
1879	Wilson's New York City Copartnership Directory (Vol. 27)	Trow City Directory Company, The (publisher & printer)		Google Books	HathiTrust		
1888	Trow City Directory Co.'s Copartnership and Corporation Directory, The (Vol. 36)	Trow City Directory Company, The (publisher); Trow's Printing and Bookbinding Company (printer)		Google Books	HathiTrust		
1889	Trow City Directory Co.'s Copartnership and Corporation Directory, The (Vol. 37)	Trow City Directory Company, The (publisher); Trow's Printing and Bookbinding Company (printer)		Google Books	HathiTrust		
1890	Trow City Directory Co.'s Copartnership and Corporation Directory, The (Vol. 37)	Trow City Directory Company, The (publisher); Trow's Printing and Bookbinding Company (printer)		Google Books	HathiTrust	Internet Archive	
1895	Trow Copartnership and Corporation Directory, The (Vol. 43)	Trow Directory, Printing & Bookbinding Company (printer & publisher)				Internet Archive	
1900	Trow City Directory Co.'s Copartnership and Corporation Directory, The (Vol. 48)	Trow Directory, Printing & Bookbinding Co. (printer & publisher)				Internet Archive	Columbia University
1901	Trow City Directory Co.'s Copartnership and Corporation Directory, The (Vol. 49)	Trow Directory, Printing & Bookbinding Co. (printer & publisher)		Google Books			
1902	Trow City Directory Co.'s Copartnership and Corporation Directory, The (Vol. 50)	Trow Directory, Printing & Bookbinding Co. (printer & publisher)		Google Books	HathiTrust		
1904	Trow City Directory Co.'s Copartnership and Corporation Directory, The (Vol. 52)	Trow Directory, Printing & Bookbinding Co. (printer & publisher)		Google Books	HathiTrust		
1906	Trow City Directory Co.'s Copartnership and Corporation Directory, The (Vol. 54)	Trow Directory, Printing & Bookbinding Co. (printer & publisher)		Google Books			Other
1908	Trow City Directory Co.'s Copartnership and Corporation Directory, The (Vol. 56)	Trow Directory, Printing & Bookbinding Co. (printer & publisher)		Google Books			
1909	Trow City Directory Co.'s Copartnership and Corporation Directory, The (Vol. 57)	Trow Directory, Printing & Bookbinding Co. (printer & publisher)		Google Books; Google Books	HathiTrust		
1910	Trow City Directory Co.'s Copartnership and Corporation Directory, The (Vol. 58)	Trow Directory, Printing & Bookbinding Co. (printer & publisher)		Google Books	HathiTrust		
1912	Trow City Directory Co.'s Copartnership and Corporation Directory, The (Vol. 60)	Trow Directory, Printing & Bookbinding Co. (printer & publisher)			HathiTrust		
1914	Trow City Directory Co.'s Copartnership and Corporation Directory, The (Vol. 62)	Trow Directory, Printing & Bookbinding Co. (printer & publisher)		Google Books			
1915	R.L. Polk & Co.'s 1915 Trow New York Copartnership and Corporation Directory (Vol. 63); Manhattan and Bronx	R.L. Polk & Co. (printer & publisher)	R.L. Polk & Co. (compiler)	Google Books	HathiTrust		
1918	R.L. Polk & Co.'s 1918–19 Trow New York Copartnership and Corporation Directory (Vol. 66); Manhattan and Bronx	R.L. Polk & Co. (printer & publisher)	R.L. Polk & Co. (compiler)	Google Books; Google Books	HathiTrust		
1926	R.L. Polk & Co.'s 1926 Trow New York Copartnership and Corporation Directory (Vol. 69); Manhattan and Bronx	R.L. Polk & Co. (printer & publisher)	R.L. Polk & Co. (compiler)			Internet Archive	

=== Tax records ===
Year	Title	Printer	Compiler(s)	Google Books	HathiTrust	Internet Archive	Other
1850	New York Tax Book: List of Persons, Copartnerships, and Corporations, Who Were Taxed on Seventeen Thousand Five Hundred Dollars, and Upwards, in the City of New York, in the Year 1850 (1851)	New York: John F. Whitney (publisher)	William A. Darling (compiler)		HathiTrust	Internet Archive	

=== Citizens and strangers' guides ===
Year	Title	Printer	Compiler(s)	Google Books	HathiTrust	Internet Archive	Other
1833	New-York As It Is, in 1833; and Citizens Advertising Directory (Vol. 1)	John Disturnell (1801–1877) (publisher); Clayton & Van Norden (printer)	Edwin Williams (1797–1854)	Google Books	HathiTrust	Internet Archive	
1834	New-York As It Is, in 1834; and Citizens Advertising Directory (Vol. 2)	John Disturnell (1801–1877) (publisher); E.B. Clayton (printer)	Edwin Williams (1797–1854)	Michigan		Michigan; Library of Congress; Library of Congress	
1835	New-York As It Is, in 1835; and Citizens Advertising Directory (Vol. 3)	John Disturnell (1801–1877) (publisher); E.B. Clayton (printer)		NYPL			
1837	New-York As It Is, in 1837 (Vol. 4)	John Disturnell (1801–1877) (publisher); J.W. Bell (printer)			HathiTrust	Internet Archive; Internet Archive; Internet Archive	
1847	A Description of the City of New York: With a brief account of the cities, towns, villages and places of resort within thirty miles; designed as a Guide for Citizens and Strangers, to all places to all places of attraction in the city and its vicinity; with maps and illustrations	John Disturnell (1801–1877) (publisher)	Orville L. Holley (ed.)			Internet Archive; Internet Archive	
1853	Citizen and Strangers' Pictorial and Business Directory, The, for the City of New-York, and its Vicinity	Charles Spalding & Co. (publisher)	Solyman Brown (1790–1876) (editor)		HathiTrust	Internet Archive	
1857	Phelps' Strangers and Citizens' Guide to New York City	Gaylord Watson (successor to Phelps & Watson) (publisher)	© Humphrey Phelps	Google Books; Google Books			
1859	Phelps' Strangers and Citizens' Guide to New York City	Phelps & Watson (publisher)	© Humphrey Phelps	Google Books			
1859	Miller's New York as It Is; Or, Stranger's Guide-Book to the Cities of New York, Brooklyn, and Adjacent Places	James Miller (publisher) (died 1883)		Google Books			NYPL
1863	Miller's New York as It Is; Or, Stranger's Guide-Book to the Cities of New York, Brooklyn, and Adjacent Places	James Miller (publisher) (died 1883)		Google Books			
1865	Miller's New York as It Is; Or, Stranger's Guide-Book to the Cities of New York, Brooklyn, and Adjacent Places	James Miller (publisher) (died 1883)		Google Books			
1866	Miller's New York as It Is; Or, Stranger's Guide-Book to the Cities of New York, Brooklyn, and Adjacent Places	James Miller (publisher) (died 1883)		Google Books; Google Books; Google Books			
1867	Miller's New York as It Is; Or, Stranger's Guide-Book to the Cities of New York, Brooklyn, and Adjacent Places	James Miller (publisher)		Google Books; Google Books	HathiTrust		
1870	Miller's New York as It Is; Or, Stranger's Guide-Book to the Cities of New York, Brooklyn, and Adjacent Places	James Miller (publisher)		Google Books			
1871	Miller's New York as It Is; Or, Stranger's Guide-Book to the Cities of New York, Brooklyn, and Adjacent Places	James Miller (publisher)		Google Books			
1872	Miller's New York as It Is; Or, Stranger's Guide-Book to the Cities of New York, Brooklyn, and Adjacent Places	James Miller (publisher)		Google Books	HathiTrust	Internet Archive	
1876	New York as It Was and as It Is: Giving an Account of the City From Its Settlement to the Present Time; Forming a Complete Guide to the Great Metropolis of the Nation, Including the City of Brooklyn and the Surrounding Cities and Villages; Together With a Classified Business Directory; With Map and Illustrations	David Van Nostrand (publisher); John Polhemus (1826–1894) (printer)	John Disturnell (1801–1877)	Google Books		Internet Archive; Internet Archive; Internet Archive; Internet Archive	
1880	Miller's New York as It Is; Or, Stranger's Guide-Book to the Cities of New York, Brooklyn, and Adjacent Places	James Miller (publisher)		Google Books			
1917	Book of New York, The	The Penn Publishing Company	Robert Shackleton	Google Books		Internet Archive	

=== Route and city guides ===
Year	Title	Printer	Compiler(s)	Google Books	HathiTrust	Internet Archive	Other
1857	Dinsmore's Thirty Miles Around New York, By Railroad, Stage, Steamboat, Express and Telegraph; How To Get in and out of the Metropolis	Dinsmore & Co. (publisher) (Lemuel Fletcher Dinsmore; 1819–1885)	Thomas Towndrow (1810–1898) (compiler & ed.)		HathiTrust	Internet Archive	
1862	Clark & Stephenson's New York City Guide for August 1862 (5th ed.)	French & Wheat (printer)			HathiTrust	Internet Archive	
1867	City of New York, The A complete guide, with descriptive sketches of objects and places of interest; with map	Taintor Brothers & Co. (Taintor's Route and City Guides); Charles Newhall Taintor (1840–1920); Joseph Lord Taintor (1835–1881)			HathiTrust		
1872	Guía de la Ciudad de Nueva York Por Antonio Bachiller y Morales (1812–1889)	Néstor Ponce de Leon (José Néstor Ponce de León y de la Guardia; 1937–1899) (publisher); Manuel María Zarzamendi (1830–1891) (printer) (Note: Manuel María Zarzamendi (c. 1830 – 9 February 1891 Córdoba, Veracruz, Mexico), was from La Victoria, Venezuela. He had been a typographer and journalist in Venezuela, then a printer and literary translator in New York, then printer publisher in Mexico. In Caracas, he had been editor of the publication, El Noticioso General, published twice a week. In 1858, the Federal War in Venezuela broke out. That same year, Zarzamendi became the first to introduce a steam powered printing press in Caracas. He immigrated to United States, arriving in New York City July 22, 1867. According to Jens Andermann (de) and William Rowe in their 2006 book, Images of Power: Iconography, Culture and the State in Latin America (Note 10, p. 75; Berghahn Books; OCLC 70845266), his wife was, as an artist, "relatively successful in commercial terms with her 'chromophotographic miniatures in oil.'")	Néstor Ponce de Leon (compiler)		HathiTrust	Internet Archive	
1876	City of New York, The A complete guide, descriptive sketches of objects and places of interest and condensed tables of churches, institutions, banks, hotels, city railroads, ferries, stage lines, amusements, etc. also travelers' directory for railroads, steamboats, ocean steamers; and a complete new street directory	Taintor Brothers & Co. (Taintor's Route and City Guides)		Google Books		Internet Archive	
1877	Wilson's Street and Avenue Directory of the City of New York; Corrected May 1, 1876 (this is usually included as an appendix to Trow's New York City Directory)	Trow City Directory Co., The (publisher)			HathiTrust	Internet Archive	
1884	City of New York, The A complete guide, descriptive sketches of objects and places of interest and condensed tables of churches, institutions, banks, hotels, city railroads, ferries, stage lines, amusements, etc. also travelers' directory for railroads, steamboats, ocean steamers; and a complete new street directory	Taintor Brothers, Merrill & Co. (Taintor's Route and City Guides)			HathiTrust	Internet Archive	
1885	City of New York, The A complete guide, descriptive sketches of objects and places of interest and condensed tables of churches, institutions, banks, hotels, city railroads, ferries, stage lines, amusements, etc. also travelers' directory for railroads, steamboats, ocean steamers; and a complete new street directory	Taintor Brothers, Merrill & Co. (Taintor's Route and City Guides)				Internet Archive	
1908	Handy Guide to New York City	Rand, McNally & Co. (publisher)	Ernest Ingersoll			Internet Archive	
1923	The New "Red Book" – Information Street and Subway Guide to New York City, Manhattan and Bronx Boroughs – With Indexed Map – Also Sectional Maps	Interstate Map Company				Internet Archive	
1924	The New "Red Book" – Information Street and Subway Guide to New York City, Manhattan and Bronx Boroughs – With New Indexed Map	Interstate Map Company				Internet Archive	
1935	The "Red Book" – Street Guide and General Information to New York City, Manhattan and Bronx Boroughs – Latest Indexed Map	Interstate Map Company				Internet Archive	
1939	New York City Guide (American Guide Series)	Random House (publisher)	Lou Gody (editor-in-chief); Chester D. Harvey (editor)	Google Books	HathiTrust	Internet Archive	

=== Charities, social services, and church directories ===
Year	Title	Printer	Compiler(s)	Google Books	HathiTrust	Internet Archive	Other
1867	A Church Directory for New York City (City Mission Document, No. 9)	New York City Mission (publisher)	Lewis E. Jackson (1822–1888) (editor)			Columbia	Columbia University
1874	Directory to the Charities of New York	John F. Trow & Son (printer)	Bureau of Charities	Stanford		Stanford	
1883	Classified and Descriptive Directory to the Charitable and Beneficent Societies and Institutions of the City of New York	Charity Organization Society of the City of New York; G. P. Putnam's Sons (publisher)	Charles D. Kellogg (Organizing Secretary)	Michigan			
1885–1886	Guide to the Charities of New York and Brooklyn, The	P.F. McBreen (Patrick Francis McBreen; 1843–1925) (printer & publisher)		NYPL		Illinois	
1887	Classified and Descriptive Directory to the Charitable and Beneficent Societies and Institutions of the City of New York (2nd ed.)	Charity Organization Society of the City of New York (publisher); David Hamilton Gildersleeve (1867–1909) (printer)	Charles D. Kellogg (Organizing Secretary)	Princeton; Stanford			
1888	New York Charities Directory (3rd ed.)	Charity Organization Society of the City of New York (publisher); Stettiner, Lambert & Co. (printer); Louis Stettiner (1859–1932); Simon Lambert (1844–1898); Isidor Fürst (1848–1915)	George P. Rowell (compiler)	Princeton			
1890	New York Charities Directory (4th ed.)	Charity Organization Society of the City of New York (publisher); Stettiner, Lambert & Co. (printer)	Charity Organization Society of the City of New York	Columbia		Stanford	
1892	New York Charities Directory (5th ed.)	Charity Organization Society of the City of New York (publisher); Stettiner, Lambert & Co. (printer)	Charity Organization Society of the City of New York	Stanford		Illinois	
1895	New York Charities Directory (6th ed.)	Charity Organization Society of the City of New York (publisher); The Knickerbocker Press (printer)	Charity Organization Society of the City of New York	Princeton; Columbia			
1896	New York Charities Directory (7th ed.)	Charity Organization Society of the City of New York (publisher); The Knickerbocker Press (printer)	Charity Organization Society of the City of New York	Princeton			
1898	New York Charities Directory (8th ed.)	Charity Organization Society of the City of New York (publisher); The Knickerbocker Press (printer)	Samuel Macauley Jackson, Chairman of the Committee on Publication; Charity Organization Society of the City of New York	Stanford			
1900	New York Charities Directory (10th ed.)	Charity Organization Society of the City of New York (publisher); The Knickerbocker Press (printer)	Samuel Macauley Jackson, Chairman of the Committee on Publication; Charity Organization Society of the City of New York	Princeton			
1905	Better New York, The	The Baker and Taylor Co. (printer); The American Institute of Social Service (publisher)	William Howe Tolman (1861–1958)	NYPL		Columbia	
1905	New York Charities Directory (15th ed.)	Charity Organization Society of the City of New York (publisher); The Knickerbocker Press (printer)	Mary E. David (compiler)	Princeton			
1906	New York Charities Directory (16th ed.)	Charity Organization Society of the City of New York (publisher); The Knickerbocker Press (printer)	Mary E. David (compiler)	Chicago			
1907	New York Charities Directory (17th ed.)	Charity Organization Society of the City of New York (publisher); B.H. Tyrrel (Benjamin Harvey Tyrrel; 1839–1908) (printer)	Mary E. David (compiler)	Columbia			
1909	New York Charities Directory (18th ed.)	Charity Organization Society of the City of New York (publisher); Press of B.H. Tyrrell (printer)	H.R. Hurd (compiler)	Chicago; Chicago; Iowa			
1910	New York Charities Directory (19th ed.)	Charity Organization Society of the City of New York (publisher); Press of B.H. Tyrrell (printer)	H.R. Hurd (compiler)	Chicago			
1911	New York Charities Directory (20th ed.)	Charity Organization Society of the City of New York (publisher); Press of B.H. Tyrrell (printer)	Seba Eldridge (1885–1953) (ed.)	Michigan; Chicago; Illinois			
1915	New York Charities Directory (24th ed.)	Charity Organization Society of the City of New York (publisher); Douglas C. McMurtrie (printer)	Lina D. Miller (ed.)			Internet Archive	
1916	New York Charities Directory (25th ed.)	Charity Organization Society of the City of New York (publisher); Douglas C. McMurtrie (printer)	Lina D. Miller (ed.)	Columbia			
1918	New York Charities Directory (27th ed.)	Charity Organization Society of the City of New York (publisher); Douglas C. McMurtrie (printer)	Lina D. Miller (ed.)	Princeton; Columbia; Illinois			
1919	New York Charities Directory (28th ed.)	Charity Organization Society of the City of New York (publisher); Douglas C. McMurtrie (printer)	Lina D. Miller (ed.)	Chicago			
1921	Directory of Social Agencies of New York (30th ed.)	Charity Organization Society of the City of New York (publisher)	Lina D. Miller (ed.)	Princeton; Columbia; Ohio State			|-
1922	Directory of Social Agencies of New York (31st ed.)	Charity Organization Society of the City of New York (publisher)	Lina D. Miller (ed.)	Iowa			
1923	Directory of Social Agencies of New York (32nd ed.)	Charity Organization Society of the City of New York (publisher)	Lina D. Miller (ed.)	Columbia			
June 1923	Hospital Social Service (rev. ed.) No. 59	Bulletin of the Russell Sage Foundation Library	Frederick Warren Jenkins (ed.)	Northwestern			

=== Public education directories ===
Year	Title	Printer	Compiler(s)	Google Books	HathiTrust	Internet Archive	Other
1874	Directory of the Board of Education for the City and County of New York	Evening Post Steam Presses (printer)		Google Books			
1876	Directory of the Board of Education for the City and County of New York	Cushing & Bardua (printer) (William T. Cushing) (Frederick W. Bardua aka Friedrich Wilhelm Bardua)		Google Books		Internet Archive	
1877	Map of the County of New York: Showing the School Districts and the Locality of the Public Schools	Cushing & Bardua (printer)					NYPL
1879	Directory of the Board of Education for the City and County of New York	Wynkoop & Hallenbeck (printer); Matthew Bennett Wynkoop (1830–1895); John J. Hallenbeck (1817–1891)		Google Books		Internet Archive	
1884	Directory of the Board of Education for the City and County of New York	Wynkoop & Hallenbeck (printer)		Google Books			
1888	Directory of the Board of Education of the City of New York	De Leeuw, Oppenheimer & Myers (printer)		Google Books			
1890	Directory of the Board of Education of the City of New York	De Leeuw & Oppenheimer (printer)		Google Books			
1892	Directory of the Board of Education of the City of New York	De Leeuw, Oppenheimer & Co. (printer)		Google Books			
1903	Directory of Teachers in the Public Schools	Board of Education of the City of New York (publisher)		Google Books			

=== Directories of directors ===
Year	Title	Printer	Compiler(s)	Google Books	HathiTrust	Internet Archive	Other
1899	Directory of Directors in the City of New York (2nd ed.)	Audit Company of New York, The (publisher); The Winthrop Press (printer)			HathiTrust; HathiTrust		
1901	Directory of Directors in the City of New York (3rd ed.)	Audit Company of New York, The (publisher); The Winthrop Press (printer)			HathiTrust		
1902	Directory of Directors in the City of New York (4th ed.)	Audit Company of New York, The (publisher); The Winthrop Press (printer)			HathiTrust		
1903	Directory of Directors in the City of New York (5th ed.)	Audit Company of New York, The (publisher); The Winthrop Press (printer)			HathiTrust; HathiTrust		
1904	Directory of Directors in the City of New York (6th ed.)	Audit Company of New York, The (publisher); The Winthrop Press (printer)			HathiTrust		
1905	Directory of Directors in the City of New York (7th ed.)	Audit Company of New York, The (publisher); The Winthrop Press (printer)			HathiTrust; HathiTrust		
1906	Directory of Directors in the City of New York (8th ed.)	Audit Company of New York, The (publisher); The Winthrop Press (printer)			HathiTrust		
1907	Directory of Directors in the City of New York (9th ed.)	Audit Company of New York, The			HathiTrust		
1909–1910	Directory of Directors in the City of New York (10th ed.)	Audit Company of New York, The			HathiTrust; HathiTrust		
1911–1912	Directory of Directors in the City of New York (11th ed.)	Audit Company of New York, The		Google Books	HathiTrust; HathiTrust		
1913–1914	Directory of Directors in the City of New York (12th ed.)	Audit Company of New York, The		Google Books; Google Books	HathiTrust; HathiTrust		
1915–1916	Directory of Directors in the City of New York (14th ed.)	Directory of Directories Company		Google Books; Google Books; Google Books	HathiTrust; HathiTrust; HathiTrust		
1917–1918	Directory of Directors in the City of New York (15th ed.)	Directory of Directories Company		Google Books	HathiTrust		
1919–1920	Directory of Directors in the City of New York (16th ed.)	Directory of Directories Company			HathiTrust		

=== Directories related to investment securities and banking ===
Year	Title	Printer	Compiler(s)	Google Books	HathiTrust	Internet Archive	Other
1842	Wealth and Biography of the Wealthy Citizens of New York City (3rd ed.)	The Sun (publisher)	Moses Yale Beach		HathiTrust		
1845	Wealth and Biography of the Wealthy Citizens of New York City (6th ed.)	The Sun (publisher)	Moses Yale Beach	Google Books			
1846	Wealth and Biography of the Wealthy Citizens of New York City (7th ed.)	The Sun (publisher)	Moses Yale Beach		HathiTrust		
1887	History of the New York Stock Exchange, The New York Stock Exchange Directory, The Produce, Consolidated Stock and Petroleum, and Cotton Exchanges of the New York and London Clearing House Systems	The Financier Company (publisher)		Google Books; Google Books		Internet Archive	
July 1892	Poor's Hand Book of Investment Securities (Vol. 3)	H.V. & H.W. Poor (publisher)		Google Books			
1894	The New York Stock Exchange → Chapter 26: "Members"	Thomas G. Hall	Francis Luther Eames (1844–1912)	Google Books		Internet Archive	
1919	New York Stock Exchange Directory	Francis Emory Fitch, Inc.		Google Books			
May 1923	New York Stock Exchange Directory			Google Books		Internet Archive	
1929	New York Stock Exchange Directory					Internet Archive	
1922	A Century of Banking in New York, 1822–1922	The Gilliss Press (Walter Gilliss; 1855–1925) (publisher)	Henry Wysham Lanier	Google Books: 1. "Who Was Who in Finance," p. 75; 2. "Wealthy Citizens' Biography," p. 92			

=== Printing Trades Blue Book ===
Year	Title	Printer	Compiler(s)	Google Books	HathiTrust	Internet Archive	Other
1917	Printing Trades Blue Book – Greater New York and Surrounding Towns Edition (Vol. 2)	A.F. Lewis & Co. (publisher); Meyer Franklin Lewis (1887–1957); Abraham Franklin Lewis (1873–1943); R. Lewis	A.F. Lewis & Co. (editor)	Google Books	HathiTrust		
1918	Printing Trades Blue Book – Greater New York and Surrounding Towns Edition (Vol. 3)	A.F. Lewis & Co. (publisher)	A.F. Lewis & Co. (editor)	Google Books	HathiTrust	Internet Archive; Internet Archive	

=== Elite directories ===
Year	Title	Printer	Compiler(s)	Google Books	HathiTrust	Internet Archive	Other
1881–1882	Phillips' Élite Directory of Private Families – And Ladies Visiting and Shopping Guide For New York City	W. Phillips & Co. (publisher); Burr Printing House (printer); 18 Jacob Street, New York; Frank Denham Harmon (1850–1907) (proprietor)	Julius William Hartz (1847–1907)		HathiTrust		
1900–1901	Phillips' Élite Directory of Private Families – And Ladies Visiting and Shopping Guide For New York City (Vol. 27)	W. Phillips & Co. (publisher); J.J. Little & Co. (printer)				Internet Archive	

=== Annual registers ===
Year	Title	Printer	Compiler(s)	Google Books	HathiTrust	Internet Archive	Other
1830	New-York Annual Register, The (Vol. 1)	J. Leavitt (publisher); Jonathan Seymour (1778–1841) (printer)	Edwin Williams (1797–1854)	Google Books; Google Books	HathiTrust		
1831	New-York Annual Register, The (Vol. 2)	Jonathan Leavitt and Collins & Hannay (publisher) (Benjamin Say Collins; 1784–1857) (Samuel Hannay)	Edwin Williams (1797–1854)	Google Books	HathiTrust	Internet Archive; Internet Archive	
1832	New-York Annual Register, The (Vol. 3)	Jonathan Seymour (1778–1841) (printer)	Edwin Williams (1797–1854)	Google Books	HathiTrust; HathiTrust; HathiTrust	Internet Archive	
1833	New-York Annual Register, The (Vol. 4)	Peter Hill (publisher)	Edwin Williams (1797–1854)	Google Books; Google Books	HathiTrust; HathiTrust; HathiTrust		
1834	New-York Annual Register, The (Vol. 5)	Edwin Williams (publisher); James Van Norden (1796–1872) (printer)	Edwin Williams (1797–1854)	Google Books; Google Books	HathiTrust; HathiTrust	Internet Archive; Internet Archive	
1835	New-York Annual Register, The (Vol. 6)	Edwin Williams (publisher); James Van Norden (1796–1872) (printer)	Edwin Williams (1797–1854)	Google Books; Google Books	HathiTrust; HathiTrust	Internet Archive; Internet Archive	
1836	New-York Annual Register, The (Vol. 7)	Edwin Williams (publisher); James Van Norden (1796–1872) (printer)	Edwin Williams (1797–1854)	Google Books; Google Books	HathiTrust; HathiTrust	Internet Archive	
1837	New-York Annual Register, The (Vol. 8)	G. C. Carvill & Co. (publisher); William H. Colyer (printer)	Edwin Williams (1797–1854)	Google Books	HathiTrust		
1840	New-York Annual Register, The (Vol. 9)	Printed and Published at Stationer's Hall	Edwin Williams (1797–1854)	Google Books; Google Books	HathiTrust; HathiTrust	Internet Archive	
1845	New-York Annual Register, The (Vol. 10)	Jansen & Bell (publisher); Jared W. Bell (printer)	Edwin Williams (1797–1854)		HathiTrust		

=== The Reference registers ===
Year	Title	Printer	Compiler(s)	Google Books	HathiTrust	Internet Archive	Other
1918–1919	Reference Register, The	White, Orr & Company (publisher) "Successor to Phillips' Directories Company" (see paragraph on this)		Google Books	HathiTrust		

=== Maps and atlases ===
Year	Title	Printer	Compiler(s)	Google Books	HathiTrust	Internet Archive	Other
1865	Sanitary and Topographical Map of the City and Island of New York – Showing original water courses and made land – the Viélé map is a revision of a 1609 map of Manhattan's topography when it was relatively unaltered by man	Prepared for the Council of Hygiene and Public Health of the Citizens' Association under the direction of Egbert L. Viele, Topographical Engineer; Ferdinand Mayer & Co. (lithographer)	Egbert Ludovicus Viélé				Stanford (David Rumsey Map Collection)
1872	V.K. Stevenson & Son's New Map of New York City	Gaylord Watson (1833–1896) (publisher); Prepared expressly for V.K. Stevenson & Son's Register					NYPL
1884	Map of New-York City	Matthews, Northrup & Co. Prepared expressly for The Trow City Directory Co. (James Newson Matthews; 1828–1888) (William Phelps Northrup; 1850–1929)					Library of Congress
1889	Map of New-York City	The Trow City Directory Co.					Library of Congress
1901	Albemarle Hotel Map of Manhattan, City of New York, The; With index of streets and strangers' directory to business houses, public buildings, principal churches, places of amusement, etc. etc. Main article: Albemarle Hotel	Colton, Ohman & Co. (engraver & printer); Octavus Bailey Libbey (1850–1907) (proprietor)					NYPL
1909	Island of Manhattan at the Time of its Discovery, The (The MacCoun map, among other things, supereimposes streets over the Viélé map)	L.L. Poates Engraving Company, (Note: L.L. Poates Publishing Co. & L.L. Poates Engraving Co., founded by Leonard L. Poates, merged to form Poates Corp. (Manhattan) January 27, 1925. Poates died October 8, 1938, in Long Beach, California – on his 53th wedding anniversary with Ida L. Kallenbach (maiden; 1862–1952).) Half moon edition					
1733–1922	Various maps						NYPL

=== New York City medical directories ===
Year	Title	Printer	Compiler(s)	Google Books	HathiTrust	Internet Archive	Other
1886	The Medical Directory of the City of New York	Medical Society of the County of New York (publisher)		Stanford			
1887	The Medical Directory of the City of New York	Medical Society of the County of New York (publisher); De Leeuw, Oppenheimer & Myers (printer)		NYPL		Columbia	
1888	The Medical Directory of the City of New York	Medical Society of the County of New York (publisher); Stettiner, Lambert & Co. (printer)				Columbia	
1889	The Medical Directory of the City of New York	Medical Society of the County of New York (publisher); Stettiner, Lambert & Co. (printer)		Bern		Columbia	
1890	The Medical Directory of the City of New York	Medical Society of the County of New York (publisher); Stettiner, Lambert & Co. (printer)				Columbia	
1891	The Medical Directory of the City of New York	Medical Society of the County of New York (publisher); Dornan (printer)		Stanford		Columbia	
1892	The Medical Directory of the City of New York	Medical Society of the County of New York (publisher); Dornan (printer)				Columbia	
1893	The Medical Directory of the City of New York	Medical Society of the County of New York (publisher); M.J. Rooney (printer)				Columbia	
1894	The Medical Directory of the City of New York	Medical Society of the County of New York (publisher); Stettiner, Lambert & Co. (printer)				Columbia	
1895	The Medical Directory of the City of New York	Medical Society of the County of New York (publisher); Stettiner, Lambert & Co. (printer)		Stanford		Columbia	
1896	The Medical Directory of the City of New York	Medical Society of the County of New York (publisher); Richard Herrmann (printer)				Columbia	
1897	The Medical Directory of the City of New York	Medical Society of the County of New York (publisher); Le Huray (printer)				Columbia	
1898	The Medical Directory of the City of New York	Medical Society of the County of New York (publisher); Wynkoop Hallenbeck Crawford Co. (printer)				Columbia	
1900	The Medical Directory of the City of New York	Medical Society of the County of New York (publisher); Wynkoop Hallenbeck Crawford Co. (printer)		Stanford		Columbia	
1901	The Medical Directory of the City of New York	Medical Society of the County of New York (publisher); Wynkoop Hallenbeck Crawford Co. (printer)		Stanford		Columbia	
1903	The Medical Directory of the City of New York	Medical Society of the County of New York (publisher); Wynkoop Hallenbeck Crawford Co. (printer)		NYPL			
1905	The Medical Directory of the City of New York	Medical Society of the County of New York (publisher); Wynkoop Hallenbeck Crawford Co. (printer)				Columbia	

=== Railway and other public transit references ===
Year	Title	Printer	Compiler(s)	Google Books	HathiTrust	Internet Archive	Other
1873	Beach Pneumatic Transit Company's Broadway Underground Railway, New York City, The – with complete maps of the City of New York and adjacent territory, showing the main lines and connections of the Broadway underground railway, profiles of the routes, etc.	Croker & Telfer, Printers		Google Books			
1899	Map showing the Metropolitan Street Railway system and lines operated in connection therewith: 232.07 miles (for Manhattan)	Colton, Ohman & Co. (engraver & printer); Metropolitan Street Railway Company (publisher)					Library of Congress

=== Society directories, including social registers ===
Year	Title	Printer	Compiler(s)	Google Books	HathiTrust	Internet Archive	Other
1887	Union League Club of New York, The	G.P. Putnam's Sons (publisher)		Google Books			
1891	Union League Club of New York, The	The Knickerbocker Press (printer) (G.P. Putnam's Sons) (publisher)		Google Books			
1894	Union League Club of New York, The	The Knickerbocker Press (printer) (G.P. Putnam's Sons) (publisher)		Google Books			
1896	Union League Club of New York, The	The Knickerbocker Press (printer) (publisher)		Google Books			
1896	Social Register, New York, 1896 Vol. 10, No. 1, November 1895 (quarterly: November, February, May, August)	Social Register Association				Internet Archive	
1897	Social Register, New York, 1897 Vol. 11, No. 1, November 1896 (quarterly: November, February, May, August)	Social Register Association			HathiTrust	Internet Archive	
1900	Social Register, New York, 1900 Vol. 14, No. 1, November 1899 (quarterly: November, February, May, August)	Social Register Association				Internet Archive	
1904	Union League Club of New York, The	The Knickerbocker Press (printer) (G.P. Putnam's Sons ) (publisher & printer)		Google Books			
1905	Union League Club of New York, The	Styles & Cash (printer) (Samuel DeWitt Styles; 1841–1910) (Alexander Cash; 1839–1910)		Google Books		Internet Archive	
1906	Union League Club of New York, The	Styles & Cash (printer) (Samuel DeWitt Styles; 1841–1910) (Alexander Cash; 1839–1910)		Google Books			
1907	Union League Club of New York, The	Styles & Cash (printer) (Samuel DeWitt Styles; 1841–1910) (Alexander Cash; 1839–1910)		Google Books			
1913	Social Register, Summer, 1913 Vol. 27, No. 63, June 1913 (quarterly: November, February, May, August)	Social Register Association		Google Books			
1914	Union League Club of New York, The	The Knickerbocker Press; G.P. Putnam's Sons (publisher & printer)		Google Books			
1915	Union League Club of New York, The	The Knickerbocker Press; G.P. Putnam's Sons (publisher & printer)		Google Books			
1917	Union League Club of New York, The	The Knickerbocker Press; G.P. Putnam's Sons (publisher & printer)		Google Books			
1919	Union League Club of New York, The	The Knickerbocker Press; G.P. Putnam's Sons (publisher & printer)		Google Books			
1920	Social Register, Summer, 1920 Vol. 34, No. 1, November 1919 (quarterly: November, February, May, August)	Social Register Association		Google Books			
1920	Union League Club of New York, The	Jaques & Co. (printer)		Google Books			

=== Early Harlem history (16th and 17th centuries) ===
Year	Title	Printer	Compiler(s)	Google Books	HathiTrust	Internet Archive	Other
1881	Harlem (City of New York) – Its Origin and Early Annals, Prefaced by Home Scenes in the Fatherlands; Or, Notices of Its Founders Before Emigration. Also, Sketches of Numerous Families and the Recovered History of the Land-Titles	Riker, James Jr. (1822–1889) (printer)	Riker, James Jr. (1822–1889)	NYPL; NYPL	NYPL; NYPL	NYPL; NYPL	
1903	New Harlem Past and Present – The Story of an Amazing Civic Wrong, Now at Last to Be Righted – With a Review of Principles of Law Involved in the Recovery of the Harlem Lands	New Harlem Publishing Company (Henry Pennington Toler; 1864–1910) (William Pennington Toler; 1860–1905) (publisher)	Carl Horton Pierce (1870–1947); Legal review by William Pennington Toler (1860–1905) and Harmon De Pau Nutting (1846–1907)	NYPL	Library of Congress	NYPL	
1904	Harlem (City of New York) – Its Origin and Early Annals, Prefaced by Home Scenes in the Fatherlands; Or, Notices of Its Founders Before Emigration. Also, Sketches of Numerous Families and the Recovered History of the Land-Titles	New Harlem Publishing Company (publisher); Journal Press (printer)	Riker, James Jr. (1822–1889); Revised by Henry Pennington Toler; Edited by Sterling Potter	NYPL	UC Berkeley	Library of Congress	

=== Unions ===
Year	Title	Printer	Compiler(s)	Google Books	HathiTrust	Internet Archive	Other
1904	Directory of Unions Affililated With the Central Federated Union of New York, N.Y.	Central Federated Union (publisher)			University of Illinois		

=== Greater New York dictionaries ===
Year	Title	Printer	Compiler(s)	Google Books	HathiTrust	Internet Archive	Other
1879	Appletons' Dictionary of New York and Vicinity	D. Appleton & Company (publisher)	Townsend Percy	Google Books			
1880	Appletons' Dictionary of New York and Vicinity (6th ed.)	D. Appleton & Company (publisher)	Townsend Percy	Google Books		Internet Archive	
1883	Appletons' Dictionary of New York and Vicinity (5th year)	D. Appleton & Company (publisher)		Google Books			
1887	Appletons' Dictionary of New York and Its Vicinity (9th year)	D. Appleton & Company (publisher)		Google Books			
1892	Appletons' Dictionary of New York and Its Vicinity (14th year)	D. Appleton & Company (publisher)		Google Books			
1898	Appletons' Dictionary of New York and Its Vicinity (20th year) First "Greater New York" Edition	D. Appleton & Company (publisher)		Google Books			
1904	Appletons' Dictionary of Greater New York and Its Neighborhood (26th ed.)	D. Appleton & Company (publisher)		Google Books			
1905	Appletons' Dictionary of Greater New York and Its Neighborhood (27th ed.)	D. Appleton & Company (publisher)				Internet Archive	

=== New York City Corporation documents ===
Year	Title	Printer	Compiler(s)	Google Books	HathiTrust	Internet Archive	Other
1843–1844	Manual of the Corporation of the City of New York (aka Valentine's Manual)	William C. Bryant (printer)	David Thomas Valentine (1801–1869)	Google Books			
1862	Manual of the Corporation of the City of New York (aka Valentine's Manual)	Edmund Jones & Co. (printer)	David Thomas Valentine (1801–1869)		HathiTrust		
1866	A Compilation of the Existing Ferry Leases and Railroad Grants Made by the Corporation of the City of New York – Together With the Grants From the Legislature From the State to Use the Streets of the City for Railroad Purposes – Also the Various Ordinances, Resolutions, &c., Passed by the Common Council, Relating to or Affecting the Same	Edmund Jones & Co. (printer)			HathiTrust		
1868	Manual of the Corporation of the City of New York	Edmund Jones & Co. (printer)	Joseph Shannon	Google Books			
1872	Documents of the Board of Aldermen of the City of New York for the Year 1872	M.B. Brown & Co. (Martin Bartholomew Brown; 1838–1893) (printer)				Internet Archive	

=== Military directories ===
Year	Title	Printer	Compiler(s)	Google Books	HathiTrust	Internet Archive	Other
1890	History of the Seventh Regiment of New York, 1806–1889 (Vol. 1)	The Seventh Regiment (publisher)	Emmons Clark (1827–1905)	Google Books; Google Books			
1890	History of the Seventh Regiment of New York, 1806–1889 (Vol. 2)	The Seventh Regiment (publisher)	Emmons Clark (1827–1905)	Google Books; Google Books			

=== Genealogical societies ===
Year	Title	Printer	Compiler(s)	Google Books	HathiTrust	Internet Archive	Other
1886	Collections of the Huguenot Society of America (Vol. 1) Registers of the Births, Marriages, and Deaths of the "Eglise Françoise à la Nouvelle York," from 1688 to 1804	Douglas Taylor (printer)	Alfred Victor Wittmeyer Sr. (1847–1926) (ed.) (Rector of the French Church du Saint-Esprit (fr))	Google Books; Google Books (2003 re-print) (preview only)		Internet Archive; Internet Archive	

=== New York State directories ===
Year	Title	Printer	Compiler(s)	Google Books	HathiTrust	Internet Archive	Other
1830	New-York State Register, The (54th Year of American Independence)	Clayton & Van Norden (printer) (E.B. Clayton) (James Van Norden; 1796–1872)	Roger Sherman Skinner (1795–1838) (ed.)	Google Books			
1843	New-York State Register, for 1843, The – Containing an almanac, civil divisions, and census of the state; with political, statistical and other information, relating to the State of New-York and the United States; also, a full list of county officers, attorneys, &c.	John Disturnell (1801–1877) (publisher)	Orville L. Holley (ed.)	Google Books	HathiTrust	Internet Archive	
1845	New-York State Register, for 1845, The – Containing an almanac for 1845–6, with political, statistical and other information, relating to the State of New-York and the United States; also, a complete list of county officers, attorneys, &c. The National Register contains a full list of U. States government officers, &c.	John Disturnell (1801–1877) (publisher); C. Van Benthuysen and Co. (printer) (Charles Van Benthuysen; 1817–1881)	Orville L. Holley (ed.)	Google Books		Internet Archive; Internet Archive	
1847	New-York State Register, for 1847, The; Being a supplement to the register for 1845–46: containing a list of the officers of the State of New-York, alphabetical list of attorneys, constitution of the State, new judiciary, &c., &c.	John Disturnell (1801–1877) (publisher); C. Van Benthuysen (printer) (Charles Van Benthuysen; 1817–1881)		Google Books	HathiTrust; HathiTrust		
1850	The New York Mercantile Union Business Directory, Containing a New Map of New York City and State, and a Business Directory, Showing the Name, Location and Business of Mercantile Firms, Manufacturing Establishments, Professional Men, Artists, Corporations, Banking, Moneyed and Literary Institutions, Courts, Public Officers, and All the Various Miscellaneous Departments, Which Contribute to the Business, Wealth and Prosperity of the State to Which Is Appended, a Short Advertising Register Many of the Principal Mercantile Houses and Manufacturing Establishments of New York and Other Cities. Carefully Collected and Arranged for 1850–51. To Be Revised and Continued	S.W. Benedict (Seth Williston Benedict; 1803–1869) (stereotyper & printer)	Samuel French, L. C. & H. L. Pratt, 293 Broadway (New York); J. B. Henshaw, 161 William Street (New York); J. C. Jones (Albany); Geo. M. Howell (Binghamton)	Harvard; Stanford	Columbia	Harvard; Columbia	
1858	Disturnell's New York State Register for 1858	John Disturnell (1801–1877) (publisher); J.J. Reed, Printer & Stereotyper			HathiTrust	Internet Archive; Internet Archive; Internet Archive	
1860	Names of Persons for Whom Marriage Licenses Were Issued by the Secretary of the Province of New York, Previous to 1784	Gideon J. Tucker, Secretary of State; Weed, Parsons and Company		Google Books; Google Books (reprint; preview)		Internet Archive; Internet Archive	
1892	Red Book, The – An Illustrated Legislative Manual of the State, Containing the Portraits and Biographies of Its Governors and Members of the Legislature	James B. Lyon (1858–1924) (publisher)	Will L. Lloyd	Google Books			
1895	Red Book, The – An Illustrated Legislative Manual of the State, Containing the Portraits and Biographies of Its Governors, State Officers and Members of the Legislature, With Portraits of Congressmen, Judges and Mayors	James B. Lyon (1858–1924) (publisher)	Edgar L. Murlin (1849–1937)	Google Books; Google Books; Google Books			
1900	Biographical Directory of the State of New York	A.T. De La Mare Printing and Publishing Co. Ltd. (printer) (Alpheus Theodore De La Mare; 1853–1950); Biographical Directory Company (incorporated) (publisher) (James De Lyon Howth, President)		Google Books		Internet Archive	
1902	New York Red Book, The	J.B. Lyon Company (James B. Lyon; 1858–1924) (publisher)	Edgar L. Murlin (1849–1937)	Google Books			
1910	New York Red Book, The	J.B. Lyon Company (James B. Lyon; 1858–1924) (publisher)	Edgar L. Murlin (1849–1937)	Google Books			
1912	First Annual Industrial Directory of New York State, 1912	John Williams (1865–1944) (Commissioner of Labor); New York State Department of Labor (publisher)	John Williams (compiler)	UC Berkeley; Michigan; Stanford			

=== State lawyer directories ===
Year	Title	Printer	Compiler(s)	Google Books	HathiTrust	Internet Archive	Other
1918	Bender's Lawyers' Diary and Directory for the State of New York (Vol. 27)	Matthew Bender & Company (publisher)		Harvard Law School			

=== State medical directories ===
Year	Title	Printer	Compiler(s)	Google Books	HathiTrust	Internet Archive	Other
1899	The Medical Directory of New York, New Jersey and Connecticut (Vol. 1)	The New York State Medical Association (publisher); Trow Directory, Printing and Bookbinding Company (printer)	E. Eliot Harris, MD (editor)			Internet Archive	
1900	The Medical Directory of New York, New Jersey and Connecticut (Vol. 2)	The New York State Medical Association (publisher); Trow Directory, Printing and Bookbinding Company (printer)		Google Books		Internet Archive	
1901	The Medical Directory of New York, New Jersey and Connecticut (Vol. 3)	The New York State Medical Association (publisher); Trow Directory, Printing and Bookbinding Company (printer)		Google Books		Internet Archive	
1902	The Medical Directory of New York, New Jersey and Connecticut (Vol. 4)	The New York State Medical Association (publisher); Trow Directory, Printing and Bookbinding Company (printer)		Google Books		Internet Archive	
1903	The Medical Directory of New York, New Jersey and Connecticut (Vol. 5)	The New York State Medical Association (publisher); Trow Directory, Printing and Bookbinding Company (printer)				Internet Archive	
1904	The Medical Directory of New York, New Jersey and Connecticut (Vol. 6)	The New York State Medical Association (publisher); Trow Directory, Printing and Bookbinding Company (printer)				Internet Archive	
1905	The Medical Directory of New York, New Jersey and Connecticut (Vol. 7)	The New York State Medical Association (publisher); Trow Directory, Printing and Bookbinding Company (printer)				Internet Archive	
1906	The Medical Directory of New York, New Jersey and Connecticut (Vol. 8)	Medical Society of the State of York (publisher); The Federal Printing Company (printer)				Internet Archive; Internet Archive	
1907	The Medical Directory of New York, New Jersey and Connecticut (Vol. 9)	Medical Society of the State of York (publisher); The Federal Printing Company (printer)				Internet Archive; Internet Archive	
1908	The Medical Directory of New York, New Jersey and Connecticut (Vol. 10)	Medical Society of the State of York (publisher); The Federal Printing Company (printer)				Internet Archive	
1909	The Medical Directory of New York, New Jersey and Connecticut (Vol. 11)	Medical Society of the State of York (publisher); The Federal Printing Company (printer)		Google Books		Internet Archive	
1910	The Medical Directory of New York, New Jersey and Connecticut (Vol. 12)	Medical Society of the State of York (publisher); The Federal Printing Company (printer)		Google Books		Internet Archive; Internet Archive	
1912	The Medical Directory of New York, New Jersey and Connecticut (Vol. 14)	Medical Society of the State of York (publisher); The Federal Printing Company (printer)				Internet Archive	
1913	The Medical Directory of New York, New Jersey and Connecticut (Vol. 15)	Medical Society of the State of York (publisher); The Federal Printing Company (printer)				Internet Archive	
1914	The Medical Directory of New York, New Jersey and Connecticut (Vol. 16)	Medical Society of the State of York (publisher); The Federal Printing Company (printer)				Internet Archive	
1916	The Medical Directory of New York, New Jersey and Connecticut (Vol. 18)	Medical Society of the State of York (publisher); The Federal Printing Company (printer)				Internet Archive; Internet Archive	
1917	The Medical Directory of New York, New Jersey and Connecticut (Vol. 19)	Medical Society of the State of York (publisher); The Federal Printing Company (printer)				Internet Archive	
1918	The Medical Directory of New York, New Jersey and Connecticut (Vol. 20)	Medical Society of the State of York (publisher); The Federal Printing Company (printer)				Internet Archive	
1919	The Medical Directory of New York, New Jersey and Connecticut (Vol. 21)	Medical Society of the State of York (publisher); The Federal Printing Company (printer)				Internet Archive	
1920	The Medical Directory of New York, New Jersey and Connecticut (Vol. 22)	Medical Society of the State of York (publisher); The Federal Printing Company (printer)				Internet Archive	
1921	The Medical Directory of New York, New Jersey and Connecticut (Vol. 23)	Medical Society of the State of York (publisher); The Federal Printing Company (printer)		Google Books		Internet Archive	
1922	The Medical Directory of New York, New Jersey and Connecticut (Vol. 24)	Medical Society of the State of York (publisher); The Federal Printing Company (printer)				Internet Archive	
1937	Medical Directory of New York, New Jersey and Connecticut (Vol. 38)	Medical Society of the State of York (publisher)				Internet Archive	
1938	Medical Directory of New York, New Jersey and Connecticut (Vol. 39)	Medical Society of the State of York (publisher)				Internet Archive	
1940	Medical Directory of New York, New Jersey and Connecticut (Vol. 40)	Medical Society of the State of York (publisher)				Internet Archive	
1947	Medical Directory of New York, New Jersey and Connecticut (Vol. 42)	Medical Society of the State of York (publisher)				Internet Archive	
1949	Medical Directory of New York, New Jersey and Connecticut (Vol. 43)	Medical Society of the State of York (publisher)				Internet Archive	

=== Surrounding area travel guides ===
Year	Title	Printer	Compiler(s)	Google Books	HathiTrust	Internet Archive	Other
1873	Hudson River by Daylight (The) New York to Albany	John Featherson (publisher); Lovejoy, Son & Co. (electrotypers) (Henry Lovejoy Sr.) (Henry William Lovejoy; 1839–1907)		Google Books	HathiTrust; HathiTrust		
1874	Hudson River by Daylight (The) New York to Albany	John Featherson (publisher); Lovejoy, Son & Co. (electrotypers) (Henry Lovejoy Sr.) (Henry William Lovejoy; 1839–1907)		Google Books			

=== The Eno Collection of New York City Views ===
Year	Title	Printer	Compiler(s)	Google Books	HathiTrust	Internet Archive	Other
1925	Eno Collection of New York City Views, The (Note: Amos F. Eno (1836–1915), son of New York City real estate tycoon Amos Richards Eno (1810–1898), never married and left his entire estate to Columbia University.)	New York Public Library	Frank Weitenkampf, L.H.D.		HathiTrust	Internet Archive	NYPL

=== Architects in Practice, New York City ===
Year	Title	Printer	Compiler(s)	Google Books	HathiTrust	Internet Archive	Other
1840–1900	Architects in Practice, New York City, 1840–1900 (1979)	The Committee for the Preservation of Architectural Records	Dennis Steadman Francis (1942–1980)			Internet Archive. 1989.	
1900–1940	Architects in Practice, New York City, 1900–1940 (1989)	The Committee for the Preservation of Architectural Records –––––––––––––––––––– J&D Associates; Union, New Jersey (publisher)	James Ward			Internet Archive. 1989.	

=== National directory of architects ===
Year	Title	Printer	Compiler(s)	Google Books	HathiTrust	Internet Archive	Other
1904–1905	Architects' Directory and Spectification Index for 1904–05 (6th ed.)	William T. Comstock (publisher)		Google Books			

=== Other directories and city references ===
Year	Title	Printer	Compiler(s)	Google Books	HathiTrust	Internet Archive	Other
1783	Book of Negroes	Sir Guy Carleton	Sir Guy Carleton				Nova Scotia Archives
1871–1872	Reference Book and Directory of the Book and Job Printers, Newspaper, Magazine and Book Publishers, Paper Manufacturers and Paper Warehouses ...	J. Arthur Murphy & Co., Publishers		Google Books			
1871	New York and its Institutions, 1609–1871 – The Brights Side of New York – A Library of Information, Pertaining to the Great Metropolis, Past and Present, With Historic Sketches of Its Churches, Schools, Public Buildings, Parks and Cemeteries, of Its Police, Fire, Health and Quarantine Departments, of Its Prisons, Hospitals, Homes, Asylums, Dispensaries and Morgue and All Municipal and Private Charitable Institutions	E.B. Treat (publisher) (Erastus Buck Treat; 1838–1928); Press of Cushing, Bardua & Co. Stereotyped at the Women's Printing House	Rev. J. F. Richmond (John Francis Richmond)	Google Books	HathiTrust		
1872	New York and its Institutions, 1609–1872 – The Brights Side of New York – A Library of Information, Pertaining to the Great Metropolis, Past and Present, With Historic Sketches of Its Churches, Schools, Public Buildings, Parks and Cemeteries, of Its Police, Fire, Health and Quarantine Departments, of Its Prisons, Hospitals, Homes, Asylums, Dispensaries and Morgue and All Municipal and Private Charitable Institutions	E.B. Treat (publisher); Press of Joseph J. Little; Stereotyped at the Women's Printing House	Rev. J. F. Richmond	Google Books; Google Books			
1873	New York and its Institutions, 1609–1873 – The Brights Side of New York – A Library of Information, Pertaining to the Great Metropolis, Past and Present, With Historic Sketches of Its Churches, Schools, Public Buildings, Parks and Cemeteries, of Its Police, Fire, Health and Quarantine Departments, of Its Prisons, Hospitals, Homes, Asylums, Dispensaries and Morgue and All Municipal and Private Charitable Institutions	E.B. Treat (publisher); Press of Carlton & Lanahan	Rev. J. F. Richmond	Google Books			
1892	King's Handbook of New York City	Moses King (1853–1909)	Moses King (1853–1909)	Google Books			
1893	King's Handbook of New York City (2nd ed.)	Moses King (1853–1909)	Moses King (1853–1909)	Google Books			
1896	Staten Island Names	Natural Science Association of Staten Island	William T. Davis	Google Books			
1915	Who's Who of the Colored Race: A General Biographical Dictionary of Men and Women of African Descent (Vol. 1)	Memento Edition: Half-Century Anniversary of Negro Freedom in U.S	Frank Lincoln Mather (ed.) (1865–1939)	Google Books; Google Books; Google Books	HathiTrust	Mather, Frank Lincoln (1976). Internet Archive. Gale Research Company. ISBN 978-0-8103-4247-7. (1976 re-print)	
1918	Printing Trades Blue Book (Greater New York and Surrounding Towns Edition)	A.F. Lewis & Co. (publisher)	A.F. Lewis & Co. (editor)	Google Books			
1936–1966	The Negro Motorist Green Book Main article: The Negro Motorist Green Book (see NYC sections in publications)	Green & Smith; Victor H. Green & Company (Victor Hugo Green)	Victor Hugo Green				NYPL
1941	Music Directory of Early New York City A File of Musicians, Music Publishers and Musical Instrument-Makers Listed in New York Directories from 1786 Through 1835, Together with the Most Important New York Music Publishers from 1836 Through 1875	New York Public Library	Virginia Larkin Redway (née Virginia Ward Larkin; 1886–1975)			Internet Archive	
1942	A Register of Artists, Engravers, Booksellers, Bookbinders, Printers & Publishers in New York City, 1633–1820	New York Public Library	George L. McKay			Internet Archive	
1991	Musical Instrument Makers of New York: A Directory of Eighteenth and Nineteenth Century Urban Craftsmen	Pendragon Press	Nancy Jane Groce (born 1952)	Google Books (preview)			OCLC 1069294403; ISBN 0-918728-97-5

=== Old Merchants of New York City ===
Year	Title	Printer	Compiler(s)	Google Books	HathiTrust	Internet Archive	Holding IDs
1863	Old Merchants of New York City	Carleton (George W. Carleton; 1832–1901) (formerly Rudd & Carleton) (George W. Carleton) (publisher)	Walter Barrett (pseudonymof Joseph Alfred Scoville; 1815–1864)	University of Wisconsin; University of Michigan; Penn State; Harvard; Harvard	Harvard; Harvard; University of Michigan; Penn State	University of Michigan; Indiana State Library; Harvard; Harvard; University of Pittsburgh	LCCN 16-16772; OCLC 6007677 (all editions)
1864	Old Merchants of New York City (First Series)	Carleton (publisher)	Walter Barrett	Koninklijke Bibliotheek; Harvard; Harvard		Harvard; Columbia	LCCN 16-16772; OCLC 6007677 (all editions)
1863	Old Merchants of New York City (Second Series; 1863 ed.)	Carleton (publisher)	Walter Barrett	NYPL; Harvard; University of Wisconsin	NYPL; NYPL; Harvard	NYPL; NYPL; Harvard; Allen County Public Library	LCCN 16-16772; OCLC 6007677 (all editions)
1864	Old Merchants of New York City (Second Series; 1864 ed.)	Carleton (publisher)	Walter Barrett	Koninklijke Bibliotheek; Stanford		Allen County Public Library; Stanford	LCCN 16-16772; OCLC 6007677 (all editions)
1865	Old Merchants of New York City (Third Series)	Carleton (publisher)	Walter Barrett	Koninklijke Bibliotheek; Harvard	University of Iowa; Harvard	Brigham Young University; Harvard; Harvard	LCCN 16-16772; OCLC 6007677 (all editions)
1866	Old Merchants of New York City (Fourth Series)	Carleton (publisher)	Walter Barrett	Harvard	Harvard	Harvard	LCCN 16-16772; OCLC 6007677 (all editions)
1870	Old Merchants of New York City (Vol. 1)	M. Doolady (Michael Doolady; c. 1810–1892) (publisher)	Walter Barrett		University of Wisconsin		LCCN 16-16772; OCLC 6007677 (all editions)
1870	Old Merchants of New York City (Vol. 2)	M. Doolady (publisher)	Walter Barrett		University of Wisconsin		LCCN 16-16772; OCLC 6007677 (all editions)
1870	Old Merchants of New York City (Vol. 3)	M. Doolady (publisher)	Walter Barrett	Wisconsin Historical Society	University of Wisconsin		LCCN 16-16772; OCLC 6007677 (all editions)
1885	Old Merchants of New York City (Vol. 1)	Thomas R. Knox & Co. (Thomas W. Knox; 1835–1896) (successor to James Miller) (publisher)	Walter Barrett	UC Berkeley	UC Berkeley; Harvard	UC Berkeley	LCCN 16-16772; OCLC 6007677 (all editions)
1885	Old Merchants of New York City (Vol. 2)	Thomas R. Knox & Co. (publisher)	Walter Barrett	UC Berkeley	UC Berkeley; Harvard	UC Berkeley	LCCN 16-16772; OCLC 6007677 (all editions)
1885	Old Merchants of New York City (Vol. 3)	Thomas R. Knox & Co. (publisher)	Walter Barrett	UC Berkeley	UC Berkeley	UC Berkeley	LCCN 16-16772; OCLC 6007677 (all editions)
1885	Old Merchants of New York City (Vol. 4)	Thomas R. Knox & Co. (publisher)	Walter Barrett	UC Berkeley	UC Berkeley	UC Berkeley	LCCN 16-16772; OCLC 6007677 (all editions)
1885	Old Merchants of New York City (Vol. 5)	Thomas R. Knox & Co. (publisher)	Walter Barrett	UC Berkeley	UC Berkeley; Harvard	UC Berkeley	LCCN 16-16772; OCLC 6007677 (all editions)
1889	Old Merchants of New York City (Vol. 2; re-print of the 1885 ed.)	Worthington Co. (publisher)	Walter Barrett			University of Toronto	LCCN 16-16772; OCLC 6007677 (all editions) https://archive.org/details/oldmerchantsofne02scovuoft/page/n5/mode/2up
1889	Old Merchants of New York City (Vol. 3; re-print of the 1885 ed.)	John W. Lovell Company (John Wurtele Lovell; 1852–1932) (publisher)	Walter Barrett			University of Toronto	LCCN 16-16772; OCLC 6007677 (all editions) https://archive.org/details/oldmerchantsofne02scovuoft/page/n5/mode/2up
1889	Old Merchants of New York City (Vol. 4; re-print of the 1885 ed.)	John W. Lovell Company (publisher)	Walter Barrett			University of Toronto	LCCN 16-16772; OCLC 6007677 (all editions)
1889	Old Merchants of New York City (Vol. 5; re-print of the 1885 ed.)	John W. Lovell Company (publisher)	Walter Barrett			University of Toronto	LCCN 16-16772; OCLC 6007677 (all editions)

=== New York history bibliography and biographical references ===
Year	Title	Printer	Compiler(s)	Google Books	HathiTrust	Internet Archive	Holding IDs
1894	New York, 1894 – Illustrated	A.F. Parsons Publishing Co. (publisher)		Columbia University			
1935	Association Membership Lists	Special Libraries Association	Special Committee of the Special Libraries Association		Ohio State University		

, compiled by a special committee ...

== Selected New York City directories not found online ==
Wilson's

1. Wilson's Directory of New York City (1849–1850)
2. Wilson's Directory of New York City (1850–1851)
3. Wilson's Directory of New York City (1852–1853)

4. Wilson's Illustrated Guide New York, NY (1849)
5. Wilson's Illustrated Guide to the Hudson River (1849)

6. Wilson's Business Directory of New York City 91848–1851)
7. Wilson's Business Directory of New York City (1851)
8. Wilson's Business Directory of New York City (1853–1854)
9. Wilson's Business Directory (1855)
10. Wilson's Business Directory of New York City (1856)
11. Wilson's Business Directory of New York City (1857–1858)
12. Wilson's Business Directory of New York City (1858)
13. Wilson's Business Directory of New York City (1859)
14. Wilson's Business Directory for New York City (1860)

15. Wilson's New York City Copartnership Directory (1855–1856)
16. Wilson's New York City Copartnership Directory (1856–1857)
17. Wilson's New York City Copartnership Directory (1857–1858)
18. Wilson's New York City Copartnership Directory (1958–1859)
19. Wilson's New York City Copartnership Directory (1859–1860)
20. Wilson's New York City Copartnership Directory (1860–1861)

Trow's

21. Trow's New York City Directory (1853–1854)
22. Trow's New York City Directory (1854–1855)
23. Trow's New York City Directory (1855–1856)
24. Trow's New York City Directory (1856–1857)
25. Trow's New York City Directory (1857–1858)
26. Trow's New York City Directory (1858–1859)
27. Trow's New York City Directory (1859–1860)
28. Trow's New York City Directory (1860–1861)

Longworth's American Almanack, New-York Register, and City Directory

29. 20th Year of American Independence (1796)
30. 21st " " (1797)
31. 22nd " " (1798)
32. 23rd " " (1799)
33. 24th " " (1800)

Longworth's American Almanac, New-York Register, and City Directory

34. 25th " " (1801)
35. 26th " " (1802)
36. 27th " " (1803)
37. 28th " " (1804)
38. 29th " " (1805)
39. 31st " " (1806)
40. 32nd " " (1807)
41. 33rd " " (1808)
42. 34th " " (1809)
43. 35th " " (1810)
44. 36th " " (1811)
45. 37th " " (1812)
46. 38th " " (1813)
47. 39th " " (1814)
48. 40th " " (1815)
49. 41st " " (1816)
50. 42nd " " (1817)
51. 43rd " " (1818)
52. 44th " " (1819)
53. 45th " " (1820)
54. 46th " " (1821)
55. 47th " " (1822)
56. 48th " " (1823)
57. 49th " " (1824)
58. 50th " " (1825)
59. 51st " " (1826)

60. Longworth's American Almanack, New York Register, and City Directory (1819–1842)
61. Longworth's New York Register and City Directory 1818

Doggett's New York City Directory

62. Doggett's New York City Directory (1845–1846)
63. Doggett's New York City Directory (1850–1851)
64. Doggett's New York City Directory (1848–1849)
65. Doggett's New York City Directory (1850–1851)

66. New York City and Co-Partnership Directory (1843–1844)
67. Doggett's New York City Co-partnership Directory (1846–1847)
68. Doggett's New York City Partnership Directory (1849–1850)

69. Doggett's New York City Street Directory 1851

70. Doggett's New York Business Directory 1846–1847

Rode's

71. Rode's New York City Directory (1850–1851)
72. Rode's New York Directory (1852–1853)
73. New York City Directory, The (12th ed.), Charles R. Rode 1853–1854
74. New York City Directory, The (13th ed.), Charles R. Rode 1854–1855

75. Rode's New York City Partnership Directory (1852–1853)
76. Rode's New York and Brooklyn Partnership Directory (1853–1854)

77. Rode's New York City Business Directory (1854–1855)

Citizen and Stranger's Guide

78. Citizens Directory and Strangers Guide (1814)
79. Citizen and Strangers' Pictorial and Business Directory (1853)
80. Directory for Citizens and Strangers (1860)

Guide books: Taintor's Route and City Guides

81. City of New York, The (1867)
82. City of New York, The (1876)
83. City of New York, The (1884)
84. City of New York, The (1885)

Other

85. 1665 (title page missing)
86. 1666–1785 (none published)
87. New York Directory 1786
88. New York Directory 1787
89. 1788 (none published)
90. New York Directory and Register for the Year 1789–1796
91. New Trade Directory for New York anno 1800
92. John Langdon and Son's New York City Directory 1804–1805
93. Jones's New York Mercantile and General Directory 1805
94. Alphabetical Table of the Situation and Extent of the Different Streets ... 1807–1808
95. Elliot & Crissy's New York Directory 1811
96. Elliot's Improved New York Double Directory 1812
97. New York As It Is 1833–1835, 1837, 1839–1849
98. Classified Mercantile Directory 1837
99. New York Business Directory 1840/41, 1841/42, 1844/45 (1842/43 t.p. missing)
100. Street Directory of the City of New York 1843
101. New York City Co-Partnership Directory 1844
102. New York City Directory 1844–1845
103. 1845 (t.p. missing)
104. United States Statistical Directory or Merchants' and Travellers' Guide With a Wholesale Business Directory of New York 1847
105. Merchant's Business director[y] and Stranger's Guide 1847–1848
106. 1847/48 (t.p. missing)
107. New York Mercantile Register 1848–1849
108. Map of the City and County of New York 1849–1850
109. New York, NY List of Persons 1850
110. A Map of the City and County of New York 1850
111. New York City Directory 1851–1852
112. School Directory of the City of New York 1856
113. New York City Mercantile and Manufacturers' Business Directory for the Year Ending May 1, 1857. New York: West, Lee & Bartlett, 335 Broadway (publisher). Mason Brothers (printer). 1857. LCCN 24-16071; OCLC 7928448 (all editions).
114. Boyd's Pictorial Directory of Broadway 1859
115. Deutscher Wegweiser durch New York und Umgegend, Tamsen & Dethleffs (eds.), 1884
116. Murphy's Business Directory for 1888
117. Holt's New-York Register, for 1804 Charles Holt (1772–1852) (printer & publisher); OCLC 926764796 (Note: Containing, an almanac for the year, etc.; Constitutions of the United States and New-York. Lists of the officers of the Federal government, executive, legislative, judicial, diplomatic, consular, etc. and the Army and Navy. Lists of the administration of the state of New-York in general, the civil officers and attorneys in the different counties, the military, clergy, lodges, post-offices and routes, towns, counties, etc. and corporations, in the state, companies and societies in Hudson, etc.) (Note: One of Holt's daughters, Elizabeth Dobbs Holt (1803–1880), married Phineas Cook Dummer (1797–1875), who, among other things, was the 6th Mayor of Jersey City.)
118. Holt's New-York Register, for 1806
119. New-York Commercial List Containing the Names and Occupations of Principal Merchants, T.P. Richards (compiler), William W. Rose (printer) (1853); OCLC 39693790
120. Twitt's Directory of Prominent Business Men in New-York, Twitt & Co. (James Twitt) (publisher) (1858); OCLC 42139312
121. Foster's Account of the Conflagration of the Principal Part of the First Ward of the City of New-York, Benjamin F. Foster, C. Foster (1835); OCLC 58760647, 878533663 (Note: Contains a map showing the extent of Great Fire of New York, December 16, 1835.)
122. Gem, or Fashionable Business Directory, George Shidell (printer) (1844); OCLC 795892391, 6118657, 1066533846
123. Who's Who in Harlem, Magazine & Periodical Printing & Pub. Co., Inc. (1950); OCLC 10143688
124. Who's Who in Harlem: the 1949–1950 biographical register of a group of distinguished persons of New York's Harlem, Alexandria, Virginia: Chadwyck-Healey (1987); OCLC 23852901
125. Stucker's Classified Business and Professional Directory, by Henri T. Stucker, New York: Henri T. Publishing Co., (1945– ); OCLC 907663199
