= Savages (1972 film) =

1972 film by James Ivory

- DVD cover
- Directed by: James Ivory
- Screenplay by: George W. S. Trow; Michael O'Donoghue
- Based on: An idea by James Ivory
- Produced by: Ismail Merchant
- Starring: Lewis J. Stadlen; Anne Francine; Sam Waterston; Susan Blakely; Ultra Violet; Salome Jens; Kathleen Widdoes; Thayer David; Christopher Pennock; Asha Puthli; Martin Kove
- Cinematography: Walter Lassally
- Edited by: Kent McKinney
- Music by: Joe Raposo; Bobby Short (theme song)
- Distributed by: Angelika Films
- Release date: June 27, 1972
- Running time: 106 minutes
- Country: United States
- Language: English
- Budget: $350,000

Savages is a 1972 Merchant Ivory Film directed by James Ivory and screenplay by George W. S. Trow and Michael O'Donoghue, based on an idea by Ivory.

The film concept given to Trow and O'Donoghue was to tell a story that was the reverse of Luis Buñuel's 1962 film The Exterminating Angel, in which guests at an elegant dinner party become bestial. Writing began in late 1968 and continued through 1969. Its first showing came at the Cannes Film Festival in May 1972.

== Synopsis ==
In contrast to Buñuel's story, Savages starts when a tribe of primitive "mudpeople" performing a sacrifice encounter a croquet ball, rolling through their forest. Following it, they find themselves on a vast, deserted Westchester estate in the 1930s.

Entering, they begin to become civilized and assume the stereotypical roles and dress of people at a weekend party. There follows an allegory of upper-class behavior. At last, they begin to devolve toward their original status, and after a battle at croquet, they disappear into the woods.

Susan Blakely, Kathleen Widdoes and Asha Puthli in James Ivory's Savages (1972).

== Reception ==
Matt Brunson noted that Savages is an "intriguing short-film idea stretched out to feature length, worth a glance primarily as an artifact of its time". Variety noted that "the playing has flair and grace".

== Release ==
This film has been released on DVD in 2004 as part of the Merchant-Ivory Collection produced by Criterion.

== Sources ==
- Mr. Mike: The Life and Work of Michael O'Donoghue by Dennis Perrin, 1999. ISBN 0-380-72832-X.

== See also ==
- List of American films of 1972
