= George W. S. Trow =

American writer

George William Swift Trow Jr. (September 28, 1943 – November 24, 2006) was an American essayist, novelist, playwright, and media critic. He worked for The New Yorker for almost 30 years, and wrote numerous essays and several books. He is best known for his long essay on television and its effect on American culture, "Within the Context of No Context," first published in The New Yorker on November 17, 1980 (and later published as a book), one of the few times the magazine devoted its central section to a single piece of writing.

== Life and career ==
Trow was born into an upper-middle-class family in Greenwich, Connecticut, the son of Anne (née Carter; 1918–2010) and George William Swift Trow (1916–1997). His father was a newspaperman. His great-great paternal grandfather, John Fowler Trow (1810–1886), was a New York-based publisher who is known today as the namesake of New York City directories. Trow studied at Phillips Exeter Academy, and graduated from Harvard University in 1965. There, he was president of The Harvard Lampoon. He later served as an editor for its offshoot, the National Lampoon, working with young humorists like Michael O'Donoghue, Henry Beard, and Douglas Kenney. He served on active duty in the U.S. Coast Guard. In 1966, Trow took a position at The New Yorker, writing articles for the magazine, especially in the section "The Talk of the Town," and contributing short fiction. He worked under editors William Shawn (1951–1987) and Robert Gottlieb (1987–1992), whom he saw as mentors.

In 1994, when new editor Tina Brown invited Roseanne Barr to oversee a special issue on women, Trow quit the magazine in protest. He abandoned the house he was building in Germantown, New York, and traveled around North America, living in Texas, Alaska, and Newfoundland. Several years before his death, he moved to Naples, Italy. In 2006 he died there, alone, having secluded himself for a decade.

Trow was socially ambitious: throughout his life, he was "striving to be part of the '10 percent of people at Harvard who wear tuxedos to their own little events in their own little buildings and you can see them out on their balconies with their tuxedos and their often very beautiful girls who are also similarly there from the Vanderbilts and the Astors.'"

== Writing ==
Throughout his career, Trow analyzed mainstream American cultural institutions to understand how the culture had changed from the newspaper-reading, eastern Establishment-dominated world of his childhood in the 1940s and early 1950s, to the ahistorical, tabloid sensibility born in the Jazz Age and propagated by television.

The appeal and value of Trow's work can be difficult to communicate, because the style "in its very essence resists summary. Summary, of course, flees from detail, whereas for Trow the details are the notes without which there is no song." Some critics have found Trow's works impenetrable and elitist; some argue that Trow's nostalgia for the pre-television era was misplaced, because the subsequent civil rights movements had made American culture more democratic.

=== Essays ===
"Within the Context of No Context", which was edited by New Yorker editor William Shawn, was published in book form in 1981 accompanied by Trow's profile of music mogul Ahmet Ertegün. In 1997, "No Context" was reprinted with a new introductory essay, "Collapsing Dominant". In "No Context", Trow pointed out the role of television in the destruction of American public culture and Americans' sense of history. "Middle-distance" institutions that had long given Americans' lives real contexts (such as fraternal organizations, bowling leagues, and women's clubs), had disappeared as people stayed home to watch television. Their replacements, television shows, were false contexts designed to be just compelling enough to keep people watching. What remained as real contexts for Americans to live in were "the grid of two hundred million" (the U.S. population at the time) and "the grid of intimacy" (the immediate family). Celebrities had a real life in both grids, and only they could now be complete. Deprived of real context, everyone else now wanted to be celebrities themselves.

Trow argued that as marketers segmented the viewers into demographically defined groups, and pitched advertisements and shows to particular niches, viewers for the first time learned to see themselves as part of an age-related demographic group rather than as part of a linear flow of people from the past into the future. In consequence, demography had replaced history as the default context for understanding the world. Things were now valued not on an absolute scale, but by discovering if one was in tune with one's group. Trow illustrates this point with a reference to Family Feud, where a contestant was asked to guess "what a poll of a hundred people had guessed would be the height of the average American woman. Guess what they guessed. Guess what they guessed the average is."

"No Context" ends with a narrative memoir of Trow's experiences working two summers as a guide at the 1964 New York World's Fair. His summary of the Fair: "At the Fair, one could see the world of television impersonating the world of history.”

In an obituary for Trow, the novelist and screenwriter Michael Tolkin is quoted as saying that "No Context" is no longer fashionable because "It's not a polemic for change. It's just a cold description of where things are going. There aren't many books that are unafraid to be that negative."

In his essay "The Harvard Black Rock Forest," Trow criticizes another mainstream American institution, Harvard University (which he had attended). The Black Rock Forest, 50 miles north of New York City along the Hudson River, had been donated to Harvard as a nature preserve for scientific studies. Trow writes about the Harvard administration's indifference to the property except as a profit opportunity, and its eventual rescue and dedication to educational nature studies.

In addition to his nonfiction, Trow also wrote casuals for The New Yorker, many of which were "subtle to the point of unintelligibility", according to Ben Yagoda.

=== Memoir ===
A memoir, My Pilgrim's Progress: Media Studies, 1950–1998, analyzes the cultural world of the United States in the 1950s, at the transitional time when television began to take over American culture. The book is written in a conversational style, sometimes transcribed from audiotapes. Trow "swirls" between pop and mainstream cultural icons, such as Doris Day, Alfred Hitchcock, Elvis Presley, and Dwight D. Eisenhower. The book cover has a photograph of President Eisenhower, whom Trow admired as "the guy of guys". Trow asserts that the models of masculine adulthood presented to his generation by the official mass culture were so out of date or irrelevant that being in/on/with television (and adopting an ironic attitude to one's self) was the only possible choice. Some reviewers were put off by the book's haughtiness, elitism, or repeated statements of authority, e.g. "You'll have to trust me on that one." According to a close friend, Trow was "extremely upset" by the critical reception of Progress. After that, he only published one known article, a critique of television news anchor Dan Rather.

=== Novel ===
Trow's only novel, The City in the Mist (1984), did not impress critics. They were put off by its minimalist style and lack of plot, narrative momentum or involving characters. The book, which moves from the mid-19th century to the present, tracks the energy in three intertwined families, from the masculine vitality of a thuggish Irish immigrant to the weak flame of his elderly bachelor grandson, who lives on his income in two rooms in New York City, and spends his time caring for his clothes and going out into what remains of Society. The central concerns of the novel – the decline of masculine energy and the replacement of masculine social authority by feminine social authority – Trow later addresses explicitly in My Pilgrim's Progress.

== Bibliography ==
- Meet Robert E. Lee (New York: Step-Up Books (Random House), 1969), as George Swift Trow. A children's book.
- Savages/Shakespeare Wallah (New York: Evergreen/Grove Press, 1973), ISBN 0394177991, James Ivory & Ruth Jhabvala Prawer (story & screenplay for Shakespeare Wallah); James Ivory & George Swift Trow & Michael O'Donoghue (story & screenplay for Savages).
- "Motifs". The Talk of the Town. The New Yorker. 49 (46): 22–24. January 7, 1974.
- The Tennis Game (1979), ISBN 0-8222-1120-3, a play, produced Off-Broadway in 1978 starring Linda Hunt.
- Prairie Avenue, a play.
- Elizabeth Dead, a play produced in 1980 at Cubiculo Theater in New York City, starring Linda Hunt. It is a 75-minute soliloquy in blank verse spoken by Queen Elizabeth I just before her death.
- Bullies (Boston: Little, Brown, 1980), ISBN 0-316-85305-4, a collection of short stories originally published in The New Yorker
- Within the Context of No Context (1981), ISBN 0-316-85306-2, a long essay (119 pages)
- The City in the Mist (Boston: Little, Brown & Co. 1984), ISBN 0-316-85307-0, a novel
- The Harvard Black Rock Forest, (1984), republished (2004) by the University of Iowa Press, ISBN 0-87745-895-2, a long essay
- Prison-Made Tuxedoes, a play incorporating performances by the Frank Morgan Quartet, produced in 1987 at the Theater at St. Clement's, New York City
- My Pilgrim's Progress: Media Studies, 1950–1998 (1999), ISBN 0-375-40134-2, a memoir of the American 20th century
- "Is Dan Mad? The Mind of an Anchorman" (c. 1998), an online article about news anchor Dan Rather
- Screenplay credits include collaboration on the films Savages (1972) and The Proprietor (1996)
