= Valentine's Manual =

The Manual of the Corporation of the City of New York, commonly known as Valentine's Manual, was published annually by the city's Common Council from 1841 to 1870, and is of historical interest today partly because of its statistics and listings of officials, but mostly because of historical essays and images added by its compilers unrelated to other specific contents.

In the early 20th century, Henry Collins Brown edited Valentine's Manual of the City of New York (1916–17 and 1917–18) and Valentine's Manual of Old New York (1919 through 1928), both also commonly referred to as Valentine's Manual, related in spirit to the original series, and with many historical pictures.

See New York City Directories § New York City Corporation documents
