= Throw (disambiguation) =

Throwing is the launching of a ballistic projectile by hand.

Throw, thrown, or throwing may also refer to:

== Music ==
=== Bands ===
- Throw (band), a punk band from the Philippines
- Throws, a British indie pop duo formed by Mike Lindsay and Sam Genders, both formerly of Tunng

=== Songs ===
- "Throw", a song by Stabbing Westward from the 1994 album Ungod
- "Thrown", a song by Opshop from the 2004 album You Are Here

== Science and engineering ==
- Throw, an element of an electrical switch
- Throw (geology), the vertical displacement of rock strata at a fault
- Throwing (programming), a transfer of control when an exception occurs

== Sports ==
- Throw (grappling), a martial arts move that involves throwing an opponent to the ground
- Throwing (cricket), an illegal bowling action involving the straightening of the arm
- Throwing a game, playing to intentionally lose

== Other uses ==
- Mardi Gras throws, small gifts or trinkets passed out during Mardi Gras parades
- Throw, the distance between gears as experienced by the driver of a manual transmission
- Throw, the act of rolling dice
- Throw (projector), the distance between a movie projector and its screen
- Throw blanket
- Throw pillow
- Throwing, another name for English knitting
- Throwing, the process of making ceramic ware on a potter's wheel

== See also ==
- Throwing bananas in sport, as racial abuse
- Trow (disambiguation)
