= Henry Collins Brown =

Scottish-born New York historian, lecturer and author

Henry Collins Brown (1862–1961) was a Scottish-born New York historian, lecturer, and author, and the founder of the Museum of the City of New York. He arrived in New York at the age of 13. After working as an advertising salesman, traveling throughout New York City, he became a journalist for The Sun, writing about the city's history as well as its buildings. Brown also wrote several books about New York's history, and was the editor of Valentine's Manual.

Brown was first married to Kate Ross (died March 1918). They had four sons and two daughters, including Kay B. Barrett. He married second Clara Brown Lyman on February 5, 1919; they resided at the New York Biltmore Hotel. He was also known to have lived in Hastings-on-Hudson.

== Selected works ==
- (1904) The new subway in Manhattan
- (1907) Mr. Goggles
- (1913) Book of old New-York,
- (1915) City of New York
- (1916) Valentine's Manual of the City of New York

Founder's edition, New Series 1916
No. 2, New Series, 1917

- (1916) Valentine's Manual of Old New York

No. 3, New Series, 1919
No. 4, New Series, 1920
No. 5, New Series, 1921
No. 6, New Series 1922
No. 7, New Series, 1923
No. 8, New Series, 1924

- (1916) Henry Collins Brown ephemera
- (1917) New York of to-day
- (1919) A plea for the restoration of City Hall Park to its colonial aspect : together with the re-erection of the old liberty pole in honor of the Liberty Boys of 1918
- (1919) The Clipper Ships of Old New York
- (1922) Old Yonkers 1646-1922 : a page of history
- (1922) When the gay white way was dark, and other stories
- (1924) Fifth Avenue old and new, 1824-1924
- (1924) Walks and talks around New York
- (1924) New York of yesterday
- (1925) The last fifty years in New York
- (1925) Restoring the century-old residential glories of the East River
- (1927) New York in the elegant eighties
- (1928) In the golden nineties
- (1928) Delmonico's : a story of old New York
- (1935) Brownstone fronts and Saratoga trunks
- (1936) From Alley Pond to Rockefeller Center
- (1937) A mind mislaid
- (1937) The lordly Hudson
