= John Fowler Trow =

American printer and publisher

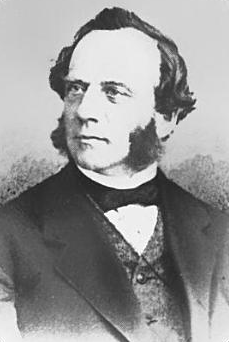
- Portrait of J. F. Trow
- Born: January 30, 1810; Andover, Massachusetts, U.S.
- Died: August 8, 1886 (aged 76); Orange, New Jersey, U.S.
- Occupations: Printer, publisher
- Known for: Trow's New York City Directory
- Children: John Fowler Trow Jr.
- Relatives: Ernest Trow Carter (grandson); George W. S. Trow (great-great-grandson)

John Fowler Trow (30 January 1810, in Andover, Massachusetts – 8 August 1886, in Orange, New Jersey) was a printer and publisher in New York City.

== Life ==
Born in Andover, Massachusetts, he moved to New York in 1833. He began publishing city directories in 1848. His business eventually became "John F. Trow & Son," the son being John Fowler Trow Jr. (1850–1912). The publisher then became "John F. Trow & Co." Employees included Peter C. Baker. After Trow's death in 1886, Trow's Directory continued annually for some years.

== Trow's Directory ==
- Henry Wilson, ed. (1852). Directory of the City of New York. New York: John F. Trow. hdl:2027/chi.27275303.
- Trow's New York City Directory. 1857.
  - 1859 ed.
  - 1865 ed.
  - 1872 ed.
- Wilson's New York City Copartnership Directory. New York: John F. Trow. 1864.
- Trow's Business Directory of Manhattan and Bronx. Trow (Formerly Wilson's) business directory of the boroughs of Manhattan and the Bronx, city of New York1903-1911. Trow Directory, Printing & Bookbinding Co. 1898.
- Trow's Business Directory of the Borough of Queens. NY. 1899.
- Trow's Business and Residential Directory of the Borough of Richmond, City of New York. NY: Trow Directory, Printing & Bookbinding Co. 1899.
- Trow's General Directory of the Boroughs of Manhattan and Bronx. NY: Trow Directory, Printing & Bookbinding Co. 1909.
- R.L. Polk & Co.'s 1918-19 Trow New York Copartnership and Corporation Directory, Boroughs of Manhattan and Bronx. NY: R.L. Polk & Company. 1919.

== Family (descendants) ==
John F. Trow was the grandfather of organist Ernest Trow Carter (1866–1953). He was a great-great-grandfather of American essayist, novelist, playwright, and media critic George William Swift Trow Jr. (1943–2006).
