= Kay B. Barrett =

Hollywood talent scout and agent (1902-1995)

Kay Brown Barrett
- Born: Katharine Brown; December 7, 1902; Hastings on Hudson, New York, U.S.
- Died: January 18, 1995 (aged 92); Hightstown, New Jersey, U.S.
- Occupations: Agent, Representative, Talent Scout
- Spouse: James Barrett

Katharine "Kay" Brown Barrett (December 7, 1902 – January 18, 1995) was a Hollywood talent scout and agent beginning in the 1930s. She is most famous for bringing Margaret Mitchell's novel Gone with the Wind to the attention of David O. Selznick, for whom she worked, in 1936. She had a long career as representative, talent scout and agent with Leland Hayward, MCA and International Creative Management ("ICM").

== Career ==
Brown was born into New York high society as the daughter of Kate Ross and Henry Collins Brown, a founder of the Museum of the City of New York. In later years, her Hollywood friends were amused by the fact that she was listed in the New York Social Register.

In 1924, she graduated from Wellesley College with a B.A. in English and an interest in drama. After graduation, she went to work for the Mary Arden Theater School in Peterborough, New Hampshire, which was owned by Joseph P. Kennedy Sr. and Boston lawyer Guy Currier. In 1926, Kennedy and Currier acquired the movie studio Film Booking Offices of America and offered Brown a job in New York reading and acquiring literary properties for the company, with the title "Eastern Story Editor". She stayed with the company, renamed RKO in 1928 after its acquisition by Radio Corporation of America, and achieved her first major success by acquiring Edna Ferber's novel Cimarron. which was being sought by many movie companies, for a then-record $125,000. The movie of the book won the 1931 Academy Award for Best Picture.

Later in 1931, David O. Selznick took over RKO. Selznick left RKO in 1933 to return to MGM, but in 1935 he found a financial backer, John Hay Whitney, who allowed him to set up his own studio, Selznick International Pictures. One of his first hires was Brown, still in the role of Eastern Story Editor, but later as "Eastern Representative" as Selznick expanded her role at the studio to that of his primary assistant. In addition to Gone with the Wind, she brought Daphne du Maurier's Rebecca to the attention of Selznick. She also persuaded Ingrid Bergman to leave Stockholm for Hollywood for the Selznick production Intermezzo: A Love Story; signed Laurence Olivier to his first American contract for Rebecca, and convinced Alfred Hitchcock to sign a seven-year contract with Selznick International so that he could direct Rebecca. She also acquired the rights to Rose Franken's Claudia: The Story of a Marriage in 1939 and was involved in the screen tests for that story that led to Phylis Walker (later renamed Jennifer Jones by Brown and Selznick) being signed by the studio.

For tax reasons, Selznick International Pictures was liquidated in 1942, and the "tall, elegant and formidable" Brown, following the example of Selznick's brother Myron, became a talent agent, joining MCA at first and picking up many new clients after MCA acquired Leland Hayward's talent agency. She eventually moved to International Famous Agency, which later became ICM, where she worked for the rest of her career. Among others, she represented actors Alec Guinness, John Gielgud, Ralph Richardson, Rex Harrison, Fredric March, Patricia Neal and Montgomery Clift. Her background acquiring literary properties also led her to represent writers such as Lillian Hellman, Isak Dinesen and, for 40 years, Arthur Miller. Brown Barrett finally retired when she was 80.

== Personal life ==
Kay Brown married James Barrett (died 1967) and had two daughters, Laurinda and Kate. She died on January 18, 1995, of a stroke, aged 92, at her home in Hightstown, New Jersey.

== Filmography ==
- Gone with the Wind (1939) (story editor: Eastern) (uncredited)
- Rebecca (1940) (story editor) (uncredited)
- Hollywood: The Selznick Years (1969) (TV) .... Herself
- Hollywood the Golden Years: The RKO Story aka The RKO Story: Tales from Hollywood (UK).... Herself (2 episodes, 1987)
- Let's Face the Music and Dance (1987) TV episode (as Kay Brown) .... Herself
- Birth of a Titan (1987) TV episode (as Kay Brown) .... Herself
- The Making of a Legend: Gone with the Wind (1988) (TV) (as Kay Brown Barrett) .... Herself - Eastern Story Editor for David O. Selznick

== Notes ==
- Kay Brown Barrett was portrayed by actress Sue Ann Gilfillan in the 1980 television film, The Scarlett O'Hara War.
- According to IMDb, the character of "Betty Schaefer", the literary assistant who had total control over a producer's story acquisitions, in the film Sunset Boulevard (played by Nancy Olson) was based on Brown.
