= Step-Up Books =

The Step-Up Books were published by Random House in the 1960s and 1970s as a follow-on series for students who had surpassed the reading level of the I Can Read books.

== Titles ==
=== Nature Library ===
- Animals Do the Strangest Things, by Leonora and Arthur Hornblow, illustrated by Michael K. Frith
- Birds Do the Strangest Things
- Fish Do Strangest Things
- Insects Do the Strangest Things
- Reptiles Do the Strangest Things
- Prehistoric Monsters Do the Strangest Things
- Plants Do Amazing Things, by Hedda Nussbaum, illustrated by Joe Mathieu
- Animals Build Amazing Homes
- Sea Creatures Do the Strangest Things

=== Story of America ===
- Meet the North American Indians
- Meet Christopher Columbus
- Meet the Pilgrim Fathers, by Elizabeth Payne; illustrated by H.B. Vestal (1966)
- Meet Benjamin Franklin
- Meet George Washington, by Joan Heilbroner, illustrated by Victor Mays (1964)
- The Adventures of Lewis and Clark
- Meet Thomas Jefferson, by Marvin Barrett (1967)
- Meet Andrew Jackson, by Ormonde de Kay, Jr., illustrated by Isa Barnett (1967)
- Meet Robert E. Lee
- Meet Abraham Lincoln
- Meet Theodore Roosevelt
- Meet John F. Kennedy
- Meet Martin Luther King, Jr.
- White House Children
- Meet the Men Who Sailed the Seas by John Dyment
- The Story of Flight by Mary Lee Settle

=== History ===
- Secrets of the Mummies by Joyce Milton
- True-Life Treasure Hunts
- The First Thanksgiving by Linda Hayward, illustrated by James Watling

=== Sports Library ===
- Baseball Players Do Amazing Things
- Football Players Do Amazing Things
- Basketball Players Do Amazing Things
- Wonder Women of Sports
- Soccer Sam by Jean Marzollo, illustrated by Blanche Sims

=== Fun and Adventure ===
- Put Your Foot in Your Mouth and Other Silly Sayings
- Star Wars: The Making of the Movie
- Daredevils Do Amazing Things
- Magicians Do Amazing Things
- Kids Do Amazing Things
