= Bibliography of Philadelphia =

The following is a list of works about Philadelphia, Pennsylvania, U.S.

== List of works, arranged chronologically ==
=== Published in the 18th century ===
- Francis White (1785). Philadelphia Directory. Philadelphia: Printed by Young, Stewart, and McCulloch.
- Clement Biddle (1791). Philadelphia Directory. Philadelphia: Printed by James & Johnson.
- Edmund Hogan (1795). Prospect of Philadelphia and Check on the Next Directory. Philadelphia: Printed by Francis & Robert Bailey.
- J. Morse (1797). "Philadelphia". American Gazetteer. Boston, Massachusetts: At the presses of S. Hall, and Thomas & Andrews.
- Cornelius William Stafford (1785). Philadelphia Directory for 1799. Philadelphia: Printed by William W. Woodward.

=== Published in the 19th century ===
==== 1800s–1840s ====
- City Directory. 1800; 1801; 1802; 1808; 1810; 1819; 1822; 1825; 1837; 1841; 1849
- S.S. Moore; T.W. Jones (1804), Traveller's Directory... Philadelphia to New York (2nd ed.), Philadelphia: Mathew Carey, OCLC 9501780, OL 23720368M
- Philadelphia in 1824, Philadelphia: H.C. Carey & I. Lea, 1824
- Views in Philadelphia and its Vicinity, Philadelphia: C.G. Childs, 1827, OCLC 9146906, OL 24131130M
- John Fanning Watson (1830), Annals of Philadelphia, Philadelphia: E.L. Carey & A. Hart, OL 22335098M
- Philadelphia in 1830-1, Philadelphia: E.L. Carey and A. Hart, 1830
- "Philadelphia", American Advertising Directory, for Manufacturers and Dealers in American Goods, New York: Jocelyn, Darling & Co., 1831, OCLC 1018684
- David Brewster, ed. (1832). "Philadelphia". Edinburgh Encyclopædia. Philadelphia: Joseph and Edward Parker. hdl:2027/uc2.ark:/13960/t0gt5vw9n.
- Thomas Francis Gordon (1833), "Philadelphia", Gazetteer of the state of Pennsylvania, Philadelphia: T. Belknap
- Philadelphia As It Is, Philadelphia: P.J. Gray, 1834, OL 22889533M
- Picture of Philadelphia, Philadelphia: E.L. Carey and A. Hart, 1835, OL 22889672M
- Guide to the Lions of Philadelphia. Thomas T. Ash & Co. 1837.
- Stranger's guide to the city of Philadelphia, Philadelphia: C. P. Fessenden, 1837, OL 24364569M
- History of Philadelphia, Philadelphia: Daniel Bowen, 1839
- "Philadelphia", The North American Tourist, New York: A.T. Goodrich, 1839

==== 1850s–1890s ====
- R.A. Smith (1852), Philadelphia as it is in 1852, Philadelphia: Lindsay and Blakiston, OL 6905134M
- City Directory. 1856; 1857; 1858; 1861; 1866
- R.H. Long (1863), "Philadelphia", Hunt's Gazetteer of the Border and Southern States, Pittsburgh, Pa.: John P. Hunt
- Stranger's Guide in Philadelphia, Philadelphia: Lindsay & Blakiston, 1864, OL 24359664M
- Stranger's Guide of Philadelphia, Philadelphia: J.F. Clarke, July 1865
  - Stranger's Guide of Philadelphia, Philadelphia: J.F. Clarke, 1866
- Edward H. Hall (1867), "Philadelphia", Appletons' Hand-book of American Travel: Northern Tour (9th ed.), New York: D. Appleton & Co., OCLC 2635615
- McElroy's Philadelphia City Directory for 1867. 1837.
- George Henry Townsend (1867), "Philadelphia", A Manual of Dates (2nd ed.), London: Frederick Warne & Co.
- John Leander Bishop (1868). "Statistics of the Principal Manufacturing Cities ... with Descriptions of Remarkable Manufactories: Philadelphia". History of American Manufactures from 1608 to 1860 (3rd ed.). Philadelphia: Edward Young & Co. hdl:2027/nyp.33433066379151.
- Smith's Hand-Book and Guide in Philadelphia. Smith's new guide to Philadelphia. Philadelphia: G. Delp. 1869.
  - Smith's Hand-Book and Guide in Philadelphia, Philadelphia: G. Delp, 1871, OL 4485026M
- Stranger's Illustrated Pocket Guide to Philadelphia, Philadelphia: J.B. Lippincott & co., 1876, OL 24364682M
- "Philadelphia", Appleton's Illustrated Hand-Book of American Cities, New York: D. Appleton and Company, 1876
- "Philadelphia (2.)" . Encyclopædia Britannica. Vol. 18 (9th ed.). 1878.
- Hunt's Philadelphia Guide, Philadelphia: J.P. Hunt, 1882, OL 6905138M
- John Thomas Scharf; Thompson Westcott (1884), History of Philadelphia, 1609–1884, vol. 2, Philadelphia: L. H. Everts & Co, ISBN 9781404758285
- Rufus C. Hartranft (1884), Guide to the City of Philadelphia, Philadelphia, OCLC 7651947, OL 23705921M
- Joseph Sabin, ed. (1868). "Philadelphia". Bibliotheca Americana. Vol. 14–15. New York: J. Sabin & Sons. OCLC 13972268. + part 2. 1884-85
- Philadelphia and its Environs, J.B. Lippincott, 1889, OL 6905142M
- Albert H. Smyth (1892). The Philadelphia magazines and their contributors, 1741–1850. Philadelphia: R.M. Lindsay.
- Carroll D. Wright (1894), Slums of Baltimore, Chicago, New York, and Philadelphia, Special Report of the Commissioner of Labor, Washington, D.C.: Government Printing Office, OL 6942790M
- City of Philadelphia as it Appears in the Year 1894. G.S. Harris & Sons. 1894.
- John Russell Young, ed. (1895), Memorial History of the City of Philadelphia, vol. 1, New York: New-York History Company
- Charles H. Browning (April 1895), "Philadelphia Business Directory of 1703", American Historical Register: 5 v, hdl:2027/mdp.39015035579666
- John Russell Young, ed. (1898), Memorial History of the City of Philadelphia, vol. 2, New York City: New-York History Company
- W. E. B. Du Bois (1899). The Philadelphia Negro.
- Talcott Williams (1899), "Philadelphia", in Lyman P. Powell (ed.), Historic Towns of the Middle States, New York: G.P. Putnam's Sons, OCLC 248109

=== Published in the 20th century ===
==== 1900s–1940s ====
- James G. Barnwell (April 1900), "Proprietary Libraries in Philadelphia", Library Journal, 25, hdl:2027/mdp.39015036908088
- H.V.B. Osbourn (1900), "Philadelphia: What Are its Needs?", Proceedings of the Engineers' Club of Philadelphia, no. 17, archived from the original on April 26, 2014
- Robert C. Brooks (1901), "Philadelphia", Bibliography of Municipal Problems and City Conditions, Municipal Affairs, vol. 5 (2nd ed.), New York: Reform Club, OCLC 1855351
- Lincoln Steffens (1904), "Philadelphia", The Shame of the Cities, New York: McClure, Phillips
- Ellis Paxson Oberholtzer (1906), Literary History of Philadelphia, Philadelphia: George W. Jacobs & Co
- R.R. Wright, ed. (1907). Philadelphia Colored Directory. Philadelphia Colored Directory Company. ISBN 9780598574510.
- "Philadelphia", Jewish Encyclopedia, vol. 9, New York, 1907, hdl:2027/osu.32435029752862
- R.R. Wright, ed. (1907). Philadelphia Colored Directory. Philadelphia Colored Directory Company. ISBN 9780598574510.
- "Philadelphia", United States (4th ed.), Leipzig: K. Baedeker, 1909, OCLC 02338437
- "Philadelphia (Pennsylvania)" . Encyclopædia Britannica. Vol. 21 (11th ed.). 1911. pp. 367–373.
- Andrew Wright Crawford (1910), "What Has Been Accomplished in City Planning. Philadelphia", Hearing Before the Committee on the District of Columbia United States Senate on the Subject of City Planning. 61st Congress, 2nd Session, Senate Document No. 422, Washington: Government Printing Office, archived from the original on April 26, 2014
- Benjamin Vincent (1910), "Philadelphia", Haydn's Dictionary of Dates (25th ed.), London: Ward, Lock & Co.
- John Van Ness Ingram (1912). "(Philadelphia)". A Check List of American Eighteenth Century Newspapers in the Library of Congress.
- Albert Cook Myers (1912), Narratives of Early Pennsylvania, West New Jersey and Delaware, 1630–1707, vol. 12, New York: Charles Scribner's Sons
- Edward Hungerford (1913), "William Penn's Town", The Personality of American Cities, New York: McBride, Nast & Company
- Andrew Cunningham McLaughlin and Albert Bushnell Hart, ed. (1914). "Philadelphia". Cyclopedia of American Government. Vol. 2. D. Appleton and Company.
- Charles Morris (1916), Visitors' Guide Book to Philadelphia, Philadelphia: J.B. Lippincott Co., OL 22896326M
- Publications of the City History Society of Philadelphia, vol. 1, Philadelphia: City History Society of Philadelphia, 1917
- "(Philadelphia)". Automobile Blue Book. Vol. 3. 1918.
- Market Street, Philadelphia: The Most Historic Highway in America, Its Merchants and Its Story. Philadelphia: Joseph Jackson. 1918.
- Rand McNally Philadelphia Guide, New York: Rand McNally & Company, 1920, OL 23328539M
- "Philadelphia" . Collier's New Encyclopedia. 1921.
- Gertrude Van Duyn Southworth; Stephen Elliott Kramer (1922). "Philadelphia". Great Cities of the United States. Syracuse, New York: Iroquois Publishing Company.
- George Morgan (1926). The City of Firsts: Being a Complete History of the City of Philadelphia from Its Founding, in 1682, to the Present Time. Philadelphia: Historical publication society.
- Joseph Jackson. Encyclopedia of Philadelphia. 1931
- "Historic City of Brotherly Love", National Geographic Magazine, vol. 62, Washington, D.C., 1932
- Ellis Oberholtzer. Philadelphia: A History of the City and Its People. (4 vol 1936) online
- Federal Writers' Project (1937), "Chronology", Philadelphia, a Guide to the Nation's Birthplace, American Guide Series, Philadelphia: William Penn Association of Philadelphia
- Bridenbaugh, Carl. Cities in the Wilderness-The First Century of Urban Life in America 1625–1742 (1938) online
- Herman Collins. Philadelphia: A Story of Progress. (1941)
- "Philadelphia". The Negro Motorist Green Book. 1949. p. 63.

==== 1950s–1990s ====
- Bridenbaugh, Carl. Cities in Revolt: Urban Life in America, 1743–1776 (1955)
- Sam Bass Warner, Jr. (1971), The private city: Philadelphia in three periods of its growth, Philadelphia: University of Pennsylvania Press, OL 22085452M
- Dennis Clark (1973), The Irish in Philadelphia, Philadelphia: Temple University Press, ISBN 0877220573
- Adrienne Siegel (1975), Howard B. Furer (ed.), Philadelphia: a Chronological & Documentary History, 1615–1970, American Cities Chronology Series, Dobbs Ferry, N.Y.: Oceana Publications, ISBN 0379006219
- Philadelphia the Fabulous City of Firsts. 1976.
- Weigley, Russell F.; Wainwright, Nicholas B.; Wolf, Edwin II, eds. (1982). Philadelphia: A 300 Year History. New York: W. W. Norton. ISBN 978-0-393-01610-9.
- Fredric Miller (1983). "Documenting Modern Cities: The Philadelphia Model". The Public Historian. 5 (2): 75–86. doi:10.2307/3377252. JSTOR 3377252.
- John Francis Marion (1984), Walking Tours of Historic Philadelphia, Philadelphia: Institute for the Study of Human Issues, ISBN 089727055X
- Michael P. McCarthy (1990). "Traditions in Conflict: The Philadelphia City Hall Site Controversy". Pennsylvania History. 57 (4): 301–317. JSTOR 27773404.
- Bruce J. Evensen (1993). "'Saving the City's Reputation': Philadelphia's Struggle over Self-Identity, Sabbath-Breaking and Boxing in America's Sesquicentennial Year". Pennsylvania History. 60 (1): 6–34. JSTOR 27773587.
- M.S. Gillam & J.B. Toll, ed. (1995). Invisible Philadelphia: Community through voluntary organizations. Philadelphia: Atwater Kent Museum. ISBN 0964107406.
- Ron Avery (1999), A Concise History of Philadelphia, Philadelphia: Otis Books, ISBN 0-9658825-1-9
- Ershkowitz, Herbert. John Wanamaker: Philadelphia Merchant (Signpost Biographies-Da Capo Press, 1999)

=== Published in the 21st century ===
- David Patrick Geggus, ed. (2001). "Saint-Domingue Refugees of Color in Philadelphia". The Impact of the Haitian Revolution in the Atlantic World. University of South Carolina. ISBN 978-1-57003-416-9.
- Giberti, Bruno. (2002) Designing the Centennial: a history of the 1876 International Exhibition in Philadelphia (University Press of Kentucky).
- David Levinson, ed. (2004). "Philadelphia". Encyclopedia of Homelessness. Sage Publications. ISBN 978-0-7619-2751-8.
- Phillips, Anne E. (2005) "A history of the struggle for school desegregation in Philadelphia, 1955–1967." Pennsylvania History 72.1 : 49-76. online
- David Marley (2005), "United States: Philadelphia", Historic Cities of the Americas, vol. 2, Santa Barbara, California: ABC-CLIO, p. 604+, ISBN 1576070271
- Brookes, Karin; et al. (2005), Insight Guides: Philadelphia and Surroundings (2nd ed.), APA Publications, ISBN 1-58573-026-2
- Arrigale, Lawrence M., and Thomas H. Keels. (2012) Philadelphia's Golden Age of Retail (Arcadia Publishing).
- Jordan, David M. (2012) Occasional Glory: The History of the Philadelphia Phillies (McFarland).
- "Four Square Blocks: Philadelphia", New York Times, October 9, 2013
- American Cities Project (November 11, 2013). "Philadelphia". America's Big Cities in Volatile Times: City Profiles. Washington, D.C.: Pew Charitable Trusts.
- Abigail Perkiss, (2014). Making Good Neighbors: Civil Rights, Liberalism, and Integration in Postwar Philadelphia. Ithaca, NY: Cornell University Press.
- Adams, James H. (2015). Urban Reform and Sexual Vice in Progressive-Era Philadelphia: The Faithful and the Fallen. Lanham, MD: Lexington.
- Wilson, Arthur Herman. (2017) A History of the Philadelphia Theatre, 1835-1855 (University of Pennsylvania Press).
- Golden, Janet, and Charles E. Rosenberg. (2017) Pictures of health: A photographic history of health care in Philadelphia, 1860-1945 (University of Pennsylvania Press.)
- Harris, Michael C. (2020) Germantown: A Military History of the Battle for Philadelphia, October 4, 1777 (Savas Beatie).

== See also ==
- History of Philadelphia
- Timeline of Philadelphia
