= Ernest Trow Carter =

American organist and composer (1866-1953)

Ernest Trow Carter (1866-1953)

Ernest Trow Carter (September 3, 1866 – June 22, 1953) was an organist and composer who won the Bispham Award.

== Biography ==
He was born on September 3, 1866, in Orange, New Jersey to Aaron Carter and Sarah Swift Trow. At age seven, in 1873 he started what would become eight years of study of piano with Mary Bradshaw as his teacher. At age thirteen, in 1879, he organized an amateur orchestra, studied the cornet, was assistant conductor of the school orchestra; and at sixteen he was playing cornet in a professional orchestra.

He graduated from Princeton University, cum laude, in 1888. He composed Princeton's Steps Song and arranged music for the Princeton Glee Club. He studied piano with William Mason and singing with Francis Fisher Powers. He studied the French Horn with Hermann Hand of the New York Symphony Orchestra. He then received a Master's Degree from Columbia University.

He went to California in 1892 as musical director for the Thacher School. In 1894, he went to Berlin to study composition with Wilhelm Freudenberg and organ with Arthur Egidi.

He returned to New York around 1898. There he studied organ with Homer N. Bartlett. From 1899 to 1901 he was lecturer on music and was the choirmaster at Princeton University. For one year, around 1903, he sang in the chorus of the Metropolitan Opera Company.

He died on June 22, 1953, after a long illness at Wallick Point in Stamford, Connecticut.

== Operas ==
- The White Bird
- The Blonde Donna
