= Wired (film) =

1989 film by Larry Peerce

- Home video release poster
- Directed by: Larry Peerce
- Written by: Earl Mac Rauch
- Based on: Wired by Bob Woodward
- Produced by: Charles R. Meeker; Edward S. Feldman
- Starring: Michael Chiklis; J. T. Walsh; Patti D'Arbanville; Lucinda Jenney; Alex Rocco; Gary Groomes; Ray Sharkey
- Cinematography: Tony Imi
- Edited by: Eric A. Sears
- Music by: Basil Poledouris
- Production companies: FM Entertainment; Lion Screen Entertainment Ltd.
- Distributed by: Taurus Entertainment
- Release date: August 25, 1989
- Running time: 112 minutes
- Country: United States
- Language: English
- Budget: $13 million
- Box office: $1,089,000

Wired is a 1989 American biographical film of comedian and actor John Belushi, directed by Larry Peerce. It was based on the 1984 book of the same title by Washington Post journalist Bob Woodward, and adapted for the screen by Buckaroo Banzai creator Earl Mac Rauch. It stars Michael Chiklis in his film debut as Belushi. Wired was both a critical and a commercial failure. The film has yet to be released on DVD or Blu-ray, and the videocassette originally released by International Video Entertainment is out of print.

== Plot ==
John Belushi sings the blues number "I'm the King Bee" with the Killer Bees on Saturday Night Live in 1976. In March 1982, he is found dead via overdose and sent to the coroner's office. As night passes, a mysterious force wakes John up from the dead. Figuring out where he is, he screams out of the hospital, and is picked up by a taxi. The driver, Angel Velasquez, notices John and names a character he played; the character, a man who is a coke addict, is actually about him, and reveals himself to be John's guardian angel. He takes him to Chateau Marmont where he sees that he died the previous night. With Angel, John goes through his life and the mistakes he made when drugs interfered.

In flashbacks, John meets Judy Jacklin before he forms the band The Ravens in the 1960s. In 1972, John is trained at The Second City to "make them laugh until it hurts." On the night before the airing of the first episode of Saturday Night Live, John gets Arnie Fromson to manage him, signing a contract. John becomes one of the biggest stars on the show, and meets Cathy Smith to experiment on drugs to improve his comedy. His popularity gets him a feature film role in National Lampoon's Animal House. Playing on the beach, John accidentally asks Judy to marry him, and she accepts. John goes into deep sleep after taking a shot, which leads his wife Judy, and friend and actor Dan Aykroyd, to wake him up and discuss how much money he is spending on cocaine. John and Dan’s friendship sparks the success of their singing duo, The Blues Brothers, leading to the feature film adaptation, where John takes large amounts of cocaine to get through the filming; despite Judy trying to help him control his usage, it leads to fights with director John Landis. The drug use gets him into arguments with Dan and Arnie, and ultimately Judy, so he decides to lay off it, and get better during the filming of Continental Divide. However, the urge is too much for him and he returns to drug usage. In March 1982, with the help of Cathy Smith, John decides to try a different drug by injection: a speedball.

Intercut within all of this, Judy talks to Bob Woodward about making a book all about John Belushi's life. At first he isn't sure about doing it, but then decides to go ahead. He interviews Judy, Arnie, and Cathy about their experiences with John, but Bob begins to focus more on why John wanted to go on drugs. Seen by John and Angel, John tries to get himself to talk to Bob. After talking with Dan, Bob heads to John's room at the Chateau Marmont where he tries to piece together what the mindset of John's final night alive was like. John and Angel make a bet: if John wins a pinball game (on a pinball machine themed after The Blues Brothers), he'll live. Sadly he loses, but gets to talk to Bob before he ultimately passes on. Bob and John argue over the latter's drug usage, with Bob pointing out Judy being hurt by his actions, while John explains the pressure the film and television industries had put on him. When the time passes, John tells Bob to "breathe for him," just as he passes on in Bob's mind, leaving him speechless after learning of the ironic toxicity of the comedic environment. Audio of an interview with Cathy has her asked if the two ever had a sexual relationship, which she replies, "No, he loved his wife". The movie ends with John Belushi as Joe Cocker singing "You Are So Beautiful" on SNL as the title "Wired" forms over the scene.

== Cast ==
- Michael Chiklis as John Belushi
- Ray Sharkey as Angel Velasquez
- J. T. Walsh as Bob Woodward
- Patti D'Arbanville as Cathy Smith
- Lucinda Jenney as Judy Belushi
- Alex Rocco as Arnie Fromson
- Gary Groomes as Dan Aykroyd
- Jere Burns as Lou Connors
- Clyde Kusatsu as Coroner
- Tom Bower as Detective
- Earl Billings as Detective
- Dakin Matthews as Washington Post editor
- J. C. Quinn as Comedy coach
- Steve Vinovich as Studio executive
- Matthew Faison as Dr. Robbins
- Jon Snyder as John Landis
- Brooke McCarter as Punk Rocker
- Paul Ben-Victor as Tom Perino
- Ned Bellamy as Paul Forrest
- Billy Preston as himself

== Production ==
=== Background ===
Belushi's widow, Judith, and his manager, Bernie Brillstein, asked Bob Woodward to write a factual book about the actor to counter the speculation and rumors that had arisen after his death. Woodward, like Belushi, was from Wheaton, Illinois and had friends in common with him; Belushi had also been a fan of Woodward's investigative journalism. Although Woodward secured interviews with Belushi's family, friends and associates, he neither requested nor received approval from Judith before submitting his manuscript for publication. Those close to Belushi claimed that the book was exploitative and did not represent the man they knew. Nevertheless, Wired became a bestseller, albeit one that Belushi's family and friends publicly criticized for sensationalism and for what they perceived to be a negative and one-sided portrait of the actor. Tanner Colby, who co-wrote a biography of Belushi in 2004, later claimed that while many of the anecdotes in Woodward's book were true, Woodward missed, or did not seek out, their meaning or context.

Woodward sought to sell the book's film rights as early as 1984—the year it was published—but he found little interest in Hollywood for the project. Woodward later claimed, "A large portion of Hollywood didn't want this movie made because there's too much truth in it." Producers Edward S. Feldman and Charles R. Meeker eventually bought the film rights for the relatively modest sum of $300,000, and, lacking major studio funding, put up $1 million of the film's $13 million budget themselves. The rest of the film's funding came from the New Zealand conglomerate Lion Nathan.

Woodward served as an uncredited technical adviser on the film; the screenplay was written by Earl Mac Rauch, whose previous writing credits included Martin Scorsese's New York, New York (1977) and the science-fiction comedy The Adventures of Buckaroo Banzai Across the 8th Dimension (1984). Hired to direct the film was Larry Peerce, a film and television veteran who had directed his wife Marilyn Hassett in the films The Other Side of the Mountain (1975), Two-Minute Warning (1976), The Other Side of the Mountain Part 2 (1978), and The Bell Jar (1979).

Chiklis claimed it took the producers three years to cast the role of Belushi. Then aged 25, Chiklis heard about auditions for the part when he was weeks away from picking up his theatre arts degree at Boston University: "I rushed down to try out... In the first 24 hours, I was called back 57 times to see different people. It was the first movie I ever read for. I was called back three times at first, then six to eight months would go by and I'd be called again, asked to perform two to three times, then nothing for maybe 10 months. I'd just about given up hope, then I'd get another call for more auditions." Chiklis finally won the role after being chosen over 200 other actors, and he put on 30 pounds for the part. The blue-eyed actor also wore brown contact lenses to more closely resemble Belushi.

=== Development ===
The film adaptation of Wired did little to separate itself from the book's dubious reputation (promotional material described Wired as "the film Hollywood didn't want made"). Like the book, the film was boycotted by several of Belushi's friends and family, including Judith Belushi, Dan Aykroyd and Jim Belushi. However, in many ways, Wired diverged from its source material. The film was criticized due to the addition of several fictional elements that were not present in the book, such as the guardian angel character, and the addition of Woodward himself as a character. Other difficulties for the filmmakers during production included their inability to obtain the rights to Belushi's original Saturday Night Live skits, and so they were forced to write imitations, e.g. "Samurai Baseball." However, the screenwriters did manage to work allusions and in-jokes to Belushi's routines into scenes and dialogue in the film. The film also alludes to the fact that Belushi's fictional guardian angel may not be sending him to Heaven but possibly Hell in the film's ending, when Belushi agrees to a pivotal pinball game—a parody of the chess game between the Knight and Death in the Ingmar Bergman film The Seventh Seal (1957).

The characters of Wired are a mixture of real-life people and obvious facsimiles. Judith Belushi, Dan Aykroyd, Bob Woodward and Cathy Smith, in addition to Belushi himself, appear by name in the film. Belushi's Saturday Night Live co-stars Chevy Chase, Gilda Radner and Laraine Newman are referred to but not seen. Other real-life associates of Belushi's are depicted onscreen, but assigned fictional names; for example, Brillstein is represented in the film by Alex Rocco's character "Arnie Fromson", and Belushi's minder Smokey Wendell is represented by Blake Clark's character "Dusty Jenkins." Many real-life celebrities who figured prominently in Belushi's life and in Woodward's book (including Robert De Niro, Robin Williams, Ed Begley Jr., Treat Williams, Carrie Fisher and Steven Spielberg) are not depicted in the film at all.

An obvious portrait is made of SNL producer Lorne Michaels, played by actor Joe Urla, although the role is listed as "Stage Manager".

One scene in Wired features Joe Strummer's song "Love Kills", from the soundtrack to Sid and Nancy (1986), another biopic about a celebrity drug casualty, and which features a taxicab as a metaphor for the afterlife. In another scene in Wired, Billy Preston appears as himself, playing a piano accompaniment to Chiklis as Belushi singing the song "You Are So Beautiful" (co-written by Preston) in the style of Joe Cocker.

== Release ==
Principal photography of Wired commenced in May 1988 and finished in the autumn of that year. Though completed by the end of 1988, it was not theatricality released until August 1989. The producers of Wired had problems finding a distributor for the film, as many of the major studios refused to distribute it. Several independent studios such as New Visions (then headed by Taylor Hackford) backed away from it. Atlantic Entertainment was about to distribute Wired, but financial problems prevented that from happening, so Taurus Entertainment agreed to distribute the film.

In his book Tell Me How You Love The Picture: A Hollywood Life (2005), Feldman recalled the film's difficulties securing a distributor. He accused Hollywood powerbroker Michael Ovitz—whose Creative Artists Agency had represented Belushi, as well as Aykroyd and Bill Murray—of using his influence to sabotage the production and distribution of Wired. Ovitz himself claimed that "The film will rise or fall based on its own merits... We have nothing to do with the movie." Some studio executives claimed that their reluctance to distribute Wired was due to the film's dubious quality, rather than its subject matter. Brillstein accused the filmmakers of generating the controversy around the film themselves, in an attempt to improve its commercial prospects: "The only thing that the producers have to hang on to is the image of Wired as "the movie that Hollywood tried to stop"... I think this is a very good plan to get some excitement for the movie." In April 1989, the Los Angeles Times published the article "Another Chapter in the Strange Odyssey of Wired," vividly chronicling the obstacles the film faced throughout its production.

Wired screened at the 1989 Cannes Film Festival in May, three months before the film's general release. Jack Mathews of the Times wrote that while Wired was "one of the most anticipated films in the festival", by the end a "smattering of applause was drowned out by whistles and jeers." Afterwards, Woodward faced a hostile press conference in which he was bombarded with questions about his inclusion as a character in the film. Rita Kempley of the Post also reported that the Cannes reception "recalled a hive of John Belushi's killer bees."

== Reception ==
=== Critical reception ===
The critical response to Wired was almost uniformly hostile. Wired has an overall approval rating of 0% on Rotten Tomatoes based on 25 reviews, with an average rating of 3.3/10. The site's critics' consensus states: "A tasteless unintentional parody of the life it attempts to dramatize, Wired butchers John Belushi's memory with a misguided screenplay and unnecessary recreations of classic performances."

Leonard Maltin condemned Wired as "the film fiasco of its year" and "mind-numbingly wrongheaded." Maltin noted that Michael Chiklis "looks a little like Belushi but conveys none of his comic genius in some clumsy Saturday Night Live recreations" and that J. T. Walsh, "as Woodward, is an unintentional howl with the decade's most constipated performance."

Writing for The Washington Post, Rita Kempley dismissed the film as "the silliest celebrity bio since Mommie Dearest" and "a biography without an ounce of soul or a shred of dignity. Billed as a fantasy-comedy-drama, it manages to be none of these. The drama is laughable, the comedy lame, the fantasy without wings." Kempley described the film's direction as "ludicrous", the script as "preposterous", and also criticized Michael Chiklis' portrayal of Belushi: "Sam Kinison might have played the part -- like Belushi, he's obscene, overweight, abusive and mad as hell. Chiklis, who does look and sound like Belushi, is rather cherubic in his movie debut. There's a Bambi-ish quality to his portrait of debauchery, a strangely cute requiem for a funny man."

Also writing for The Washington Post, Desson Howe wondered if the film is "what the real Belushi's family, friends and fans really need. Certainly Belushi deserves as much scrutiny as the next public figure who died after heavy drug use, but this autopsy seems unnecessary." Howe had no praise for Michael Chiklis' performance as Belushi: "Despite a histrionic outpouring of growls, snorts, yells and re-creations of familiar Belushi shticks, from Jake Blues to Joe Cocker, Chiklis seems to miss every opportunity to redeem himself. He's loud where he should have been soft, flat where he should have been funny and dead where he should have been alive." Howe also noted that the film version of Woodward "seems to have stumbled out of a Dragnet episode."

Vincent Canby for The New York Times described the film as "a bit fuzzy and off-center." Canby also noted that Chiklis "seems to be doing the role a few years too soon. It's not only that he seems too young, but also that he simply hasn't any idea of what it's like to scrape the bottom of life's barrel." Canby did praise Patti D'Arbanville, "who is exceptionally good as the addict who fatally ministers to Belushi in his last hours. She's a lost, sad character, more vivid than anyone else in the movie."

Roger Hurlburt of the Sun-Sentinel also gave Wired a 1½-star rating, writing that "we have director Larry Peerce thinking he's Frank Capra doing It's a Wonderful Life, or worse, Charles Dickens reworking A Christmas Carol... As a film that relies on mystical scenes to join together fact, plus appearing and disappearing characters scattered among confusing time sequences, Wired is a movie of overkill. The fact is, Belushi becomes more unlikable, more idiotic and more pathetically self-destructive as the film progresses."

Caryn James for The New York Times began her Wired review with the words, "There is almost no excuse for Wired, a film so devastatingly dull that it seems longer than John Belushi's whole career", before adding "audiences do not like their pop icons tampered with, and in biographical films such tampering is inevitable. Audiences bring to such films vivid images of people they feel they know, and they have consistently rejected films that fail to reflect that image... Any weeknight, viewers can turn on television reruns of the Saturday Night Live shows that made Belushi famous. And no matter how much Michael Chiklis, the star of Wired, resembles Belushi, his Killer Bee and his Joe Cocker imitation are no match for the highly visible, memorable, syndicated originals."

Rolling Stone labeled the film "a howling dog...Whether by design or by forced compromise, Wired is even more of a gloss than the candy-assed view of Jerry Lee Lewis in Great Balls of Fire!. Far from pointing any fingers, Wired the movie hardly names names...it appears that nearly everyone Belushi encountered in big, bad Hollywood tried to warn him off demon drugs. Wired packs all the investigative wallop of a Care Bears flick." The review also criticized Michael Chiklis for capturing "none of Belushi's charm, warmth or genius. It's excruciating to watch Chiklis drain the wit from such classic Belushi routines as the Samurai, the Bees and the Blues Brothers."

In 2008, writer Nathan Rabin posted a retrospective on Wired for his series "My Year of Flops" on The A.V. Club. Rabin wrote, "To call Wired an unconscionable act of grave robbery/defilement would be an insult to the good name of grave-robbers everywhere. There are snuff films with more integrity... Watching Wired, the two questions that pop up constantly are 'What the hell were they thinking?' followed by 'What the hell were they smoking, and where can I get some?'... I will give Rauch's screenplay this much: it sure is audacious... Rauch apparently set out to write a biopic as irreverent, wild, and unconventional as Belushi himself. The stakes were high. Had the filmmakers succeeded, they would have reinvented the biopic by injecting it with vast ocean of gallows humor, magic realism, and postmodern mindfuckery. The filmmakers took enormous chances, none of which paid off. They shot for the moon and fell flat on their asses."

Richard Corliss, in his review of the film for Time Magazine, singled out Michael Chiklis's "boldly percussive performance", but described the film itself as a "turkey, overstuffed as it is with mad ambitions and bad karma."

In his review of Wired for the Houston Chronicle, Jeff Millar noted that Michael Chiklis "looks reasonably enough like Belushi, and he impersonates him well enough to make us frustratingly aware that he is not John Belushi... In the sequences when he is asked to imitate Belushi the entertainer, he is desperately overmatched – any actor would be – against the close memory of a hugely idiosyncratic comic actor."

Michael Wilmington for the Los Angeles Times praised the performances of Chiklis, D'Arbanville and Gary Groomes, but had mixed feelings about the film overall, noting that "the crippling flaw in the film lies in its mix of surface daring and inner funk. Inside, it keeps flinching."

Roger Ebert for the Chicago Sun-Times wrote that "Maybe there was no way to make a good movie out of this material, not yet, when everyone remembers Belushi and any actor who attempts to play him is sure to suffer by comparison." Awarding Wired 1½ stars out of 4, Ebert noted that Wired "is in some ways a sincere attempt to deal with the material, but it is such an ungainly and hapless movie, so stupidly written, so awkwardly directed and acted, that it never gets off the ground." In his syndicated movie review show Siskel & Ebert, Ebert did concede that Chiklis "did what he could" with his performance, while his partner Gene Siskel said that Chiklis and Groomes were very good and that the film could have been pulled off with better direction and a better script.

=== Family and friends' reactions ===
Belushi's friend John Landis, who directed the actor in the films National Lampoon's Animal House (1978) and The Blues Brothers (1980), refused to have his name incorporated into Wired and threatened to sue for invasion of privacy, causing the producers to label a generic name on the film director who appears in the film. As played by Jon Snyder, the director is an obvious lookalike of Landis during the Blues Brothers sequence, and in the scene where he is walking across the movie set, a helicopter can be heard in the background (a reference to the fatal helicopter accident that occurred when Landis filmed Twilight Zone: The Movie). The film also depicts the director punching a coked-out Belushi in the face during the filming of The Blues Brothers. This event, recounted directly from the opening of Woodward's book, was dismissed by Landis as "not true".

Dan Aykroyd was openly hostile to Wired. During an interview for MTV's The Big Picture, he said, "I have witches working now to jinx the thing... I hope it never gets seen and I am going to hurl all the negative energy I can and muster all my hell energies [against them]. My thunderbolts are out on this one, quite truthfully." Walsh, who played Woodward in Wired, was cast in a supporting role in the comedy Loose Cannons (1990) with Aykroyd, but Aykroyd had him removed from the film because of his participation in Wired. Walsh reportedly worked for two days on Loose Cannons before he was fired and replaced with Paul Koslo, causing the film a $125,000 production delay.

Two years after the release of Wired, Judith Belushi wrote her book Samurai Widow (1991) to counter the image of her late husband portrayed in Woodward's work. She also co-wrote the 2005 oral history book, Belushi: A Biography, with Tanner Colby. Judith told Entertainment Weekly in 2013, "Like Michael Chiklis said, when he was a young man and was offered that role in [Wired], he thought it was a great opportunity and it was. He was just unfortunate not to have a better script because he himself was fine."

=== Impact on Chiklis' career ===
Prior to the release of Wired, Patricia O'Haire of the New York Daily News suggested that Chiklis might be "priced out of reach" (i.e. by the film's success). Instead, Chiklis' participation in Wired derailed the actor's career for 18 months: "After Wired, everyone was afraid to touch me for fear of reprisal... It was a bittersweet situation. All of a sudden, I was starring in a major motion picture and the next thing you know, I'm being asked by reporters, 'Do you think you'll be blackballed?'" Chiklis later told James Belushi that he took on the lead role in Wired out of "love, respect and homage" for his brother, and apologized for any hurt he had caused Belushi's family. After numerous guest roles in episodic television (including Miami Vice, L.A. Law, Murphy Brown, and Seinfeld), Chiklis gained fame for portraying the lead roles of Commissioner Tony Scali on the ABC police comedy-drama The Commish (1991–1996), and LAPD Detective Vic Mackey on the FX police drama The Shield (2002–2008). His film career resurged when he played Marvel superhero Ben Grimm / The Thing in the films Fantastic Four (2005) and Fantastic Four: Rise of the Silver Surfer (2007).

Chiklis has credited Burt Reynolds for rescuing his acting career when Reynolds hired him for a role in B.L. Stryker. Chiklis said that Reynolds knew what Chiklis was going through because he "grew up during the McCarthy era and didn't believe in blackballing."
