= Samurai Widow =

Memoir by Judith Jacklin Belushi

- Cover photo
- Author: Judith Jacklin Belushi
- Language: English
- Subject: John Belushi; Judith Jacklin Belushi
- Genre: Memoir;Autobiography
- Publisher: Carroll & Graf
- Publication date: 1990
- Publication place: United States
- Media type: Print (Hardback)
- Pages: 427 (Hardback)
- ISBN: 0-88184-575-2
- OCLC: 21229051
- Dewey Decimal: 792.7/028/092 B 20
- LC Class: PN2287.B423 B44 1990

Samurai Widow (1990, Carroll & Graf) is a memoir by Judith Jacklin Belushi, the wife of comedian John Belushi. Belushi wrote Samurai Widow in response to the negative portrayal of John in the 1984 Bob Woodward book, Wired: The Short Life and Fast Times of John Belushi and its subsequent film adaptation in 1989.

The book is a loose telling of Judith's life with John, her grief after his death, and her struggle to move on with life. The contents are based around the extensive journals kept by the author after her husband's death, and a majority of the journal entries appear in the book as they were originally written. The book's title comes from one of Belushi's most famous Saturday Night Live (SNL) characters, a samurai who would have a different job each appearance (e.g. baker, lawyer, hotel manager). The character was known as Samurai Futaba.

Judith Jacklin Belushi, under the name Judith Belushi Pisano, later co-wrote the oral history book Belushi: A Biography which was published in 2005 and served as the basis for the 2020 documentary film Belushi.
