= Cheeburger Cheeburger =

Restaurant chain

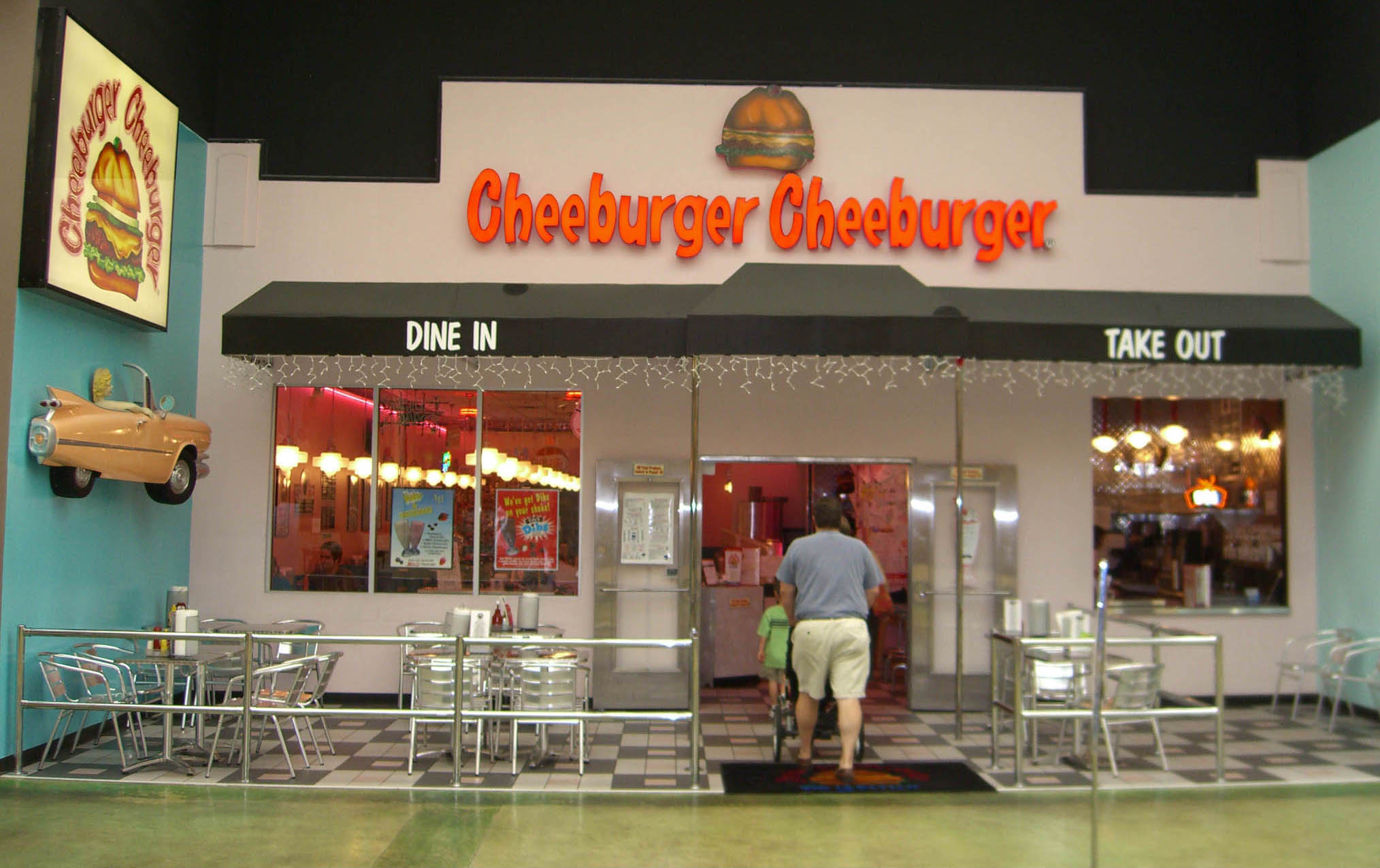
- Type: Subsidiary
- Industry: Restaurants; Franchising
- Genre: Fast casual restaurant
- Founded: 1986; 40 years ago in Sanibel Island, Florida, U.S.
- Founder: Bruce Zicari
- Headquarters: Fort Myers, Florida, United States
- Number of locations: 2 (2025)
- Area served: United States
- Key people: Bruce Zicari, CEO
- Owner: Premier Restaurant Group
- Website: cheeburger.com

Cheeburger Cheeburger is a 1950s-style fast casual restaurant chain specializing in cheeseburgers, french fries, onion rings, and milkshakes. The chain is headquartered in Fort Myers, Florida. As of 2023, Cheeburger Cheeburger has two locations in the United States.

== History ==
Bruce Zicari opened the first Cheeburger Cheeburger in Sanibel, Florida, in 1986. The restaurant was named after John Belushi's pronunciation of cheeseburger as "cheeburger" on a Saturday Night Live sketch at the fictitious Olympia Café.

The first international location opened in Kuwait but has since closed.

In November 2017, Cheeburger Cheeburger was acquired by Premier Restaurant Group.

In 2022, the original Cheeburger Cheeburger restaurant located on Sanibel Island was severely damaged by Hurricane Ian.

Several locations have closed in recent years. The chain has one location in Sanibel, Florida, and Richmond, Virginia.

== Legal matters ==
When Cheeburger Cheeburger opened a restaurant in Glenview, Illinois, they were sued by Billy Goat Tavern, which had served as the inspiration for the original Olympia Café Saturday Night Live parody. An out-of-court settlement was reached wherein the restaurant changed the name of the Glenview location to simply Cheeburger and agreed not to open another restaurant within 125 miles (200 km) of downtown Chicago.

== See also ==
- List of hamburger restaurants
