= Cathy Smith =

Canadian musician and criminal (1947–2020)

- Born: Catherine Evelyn Smith; April 25, 1947; Hamilton, Ontario, Canada
- Died: August 16, 2020 (aged 73); Maple Ridge, British Columbia, Canada
- Occupations: Rock groupie, backup singer
- Criminal charge: Involuntary manslaughter of John Belushi (1982) Possession of 2 grams of heroin (1991)
- Criminal penalty: 15 months in prison (1982), 1 year of probation and a CDN$2000 fine (1991)

Catherine Evelyn Smith (April 25, 1947 – August 16, 2020), also known as Silverbag, was a Canadian backup singer, groupie, drug dealer, and legal secretary. Smith served 15 months in the California Institution for Women for injecting actor John Belushi with a fatal dose of heroin and cocaine in 1982.

Smith had been paid for a front-page headline story in the Hollywood tabloid the National Enquirer, where she stated she was the person who injected Belushi with a fatal drug overdose. Smith co-wrote the book Chasing the Dragon (1984) which told her life story; its title alludes to Smith's heroin addiction. Smith appeared prominently in the Bob Woodward book Wired: The Short Life and Fast Times of John Belushi (1984) and was played by Patti D'Arbanville in the 1989 film adaptation.

== Levon Helm and the Band ==
Smith was born in Hamilton, Ontario. Her association with celebrities went back at least 20 years prior to her confession in the National Enquirer. Her earliest acquaintance was with Levon Helm, who later joined the Band, in 1963. In his autobiography, Helm recalls that he first met Smith in Hamilton, Ontario. Helm and his friend Rick Danko were then members of the Hawks. At one point, the musicians were in Toronto facing a drug bust.

Smith has been connected to the Band's song, "The Weight" (1968). Smith says in Rock and Roll Toronto: From Alanis to Zeppelin (1997), that Richard Manuel offered to marry her, but she refused. Nevertheless, she continued to tour and party with Helm, Danko, and Manuel through the 1960s, and at one point became pregnant with a child known as "The Band baby," as its paternity was unclear.

== Gordon Lightfoot ==
Smith became an employee (and, later, mistress) of Canadian singer-songwriter Gordon Lightfoot in the early to mid-1970s.

The Smith-Lightfoot affair was violent and illustrated in the lyrics of "Sundown" (1974), Lightfoot's No. 1 hit and most lucrative song. It reflects the dark feelings Lightfoot was experiencing at the time, with lyrics such as: "Sometimes I think it's a shame / When I get feeling better when I'm feeling no pain." Drinking too much and married to another woman, he on one occasion broke Smith's cheekbone in a fight. Lightfoot has stated of his three-year relationship with Smith, "I was sometimes crazy with jealousy".

Bluegrass musicians Bruce and Brian Good, the Good Brothers, who were one of Lightfoot's opening acts during that time, got fired by Lightfoot for "flirting" with Smith. Smith was cited in Lightfoot's divorce papers, and shortly after his affair with Smith ended, Lightfoot was a party to the most expensive divorce settlement in Canadian history to that date.

In a 1975 interview, Lightfoot expanded upon "Sundown" and hinted at the worry he experienced in his relationship with Smith:

All it is, is a thought about a situation where someone is wondering what his loved one is doing at the moment. He doesn't quite know where she is. He's not ready to give up on her, either, and that's about all I got to say about that.

Lightfoot gave another insight into his relationship with Smith in a 2000 interview when he remarked upon "Sundown" being:

[A] back-alley kind of tune. It's based on infidelity – I've seen both sides of that.

In 2008, Lightfoot gave an interview confirming that "Sundown" was written with his then-girlfriend in mind:

I think my girlfriend was out with her friends one night at a bar while I was at home writing songs. I thought, 'I wonder what she’s doing with her friends at that bar!' It’s that kind of a feeling. 'Where is my true love tonight? What is my true love doing?'

In 2014, Lightfoot added further insight into his writing of "Sundown":

Well, I had this girlfriend one time, and I was at home working, at my desk, working at my songwriting which I had been doing all week since I was on a roll, and my girlfriend was somewhere drinking, drinking somewhere. So I was hoping that no one else would get their hands on her, because she was pretty good lookin'! And that's how I wrote the song 'Sundown,' and as a matter of fact, it was written just around sundown, just as the sun was setting, behind the farm I had rented to use as a place to write the album.

== Belushi case ==
After Lightfoot and the Band, around 1976, Smith became a backup singer for Hoyt Axton, who was struggling with cocaine addiction at the time. She sang on his album Fearless (1976) and co-wrote the song "Flash of Fire" with Axton.

Smith began using heroin in the late 1970s. In Bob Woodward's book Wired, she appears as a drug dealer to Rolling Stones band members Ronnie Wood and Keith Richards during their touring and rehearsals as the New Barbarians. She moved to Los Angeles and, as her addiction increased, she became a full-time drug dealer and courier to Wood, Richards, and others in the entertainment industry. Smith first met comedian John Belushi on the set of Saturday Night Live in 1976, when the Band were the musical guests.

She later met Belushi again through Wood and Richards, when Belushi contacted her to purchase the drugs that eventually killed him. Smith claimed that she injected Belushi with 11 speedballs (a combination of cocaine and heroin) at the Chateau Marmont in Hollywood, California in March 1982, and that this injection led to his death. According to Woodward, Robin Williams was present and was "creeped out" by Smith, whom he deemed a "lowlife." Belushi had been battling cocaine addiction for years and combining it with occasional heroin use.

Released after initial questioning on the morning of Belushi's death, Smith spoke briefly to freelance writer Chris Van Ness. Then, two National Enquirer reporters, Tony Brenna and Larry Haley, spoke with her and published, four months after Belushi's death, their lengthy in-person interviews with her under the headline: "I killed John Belushi. I didn't mean to, but I am responsible." Her revelation led to the charge against Smith in Belushi's murder and 13 counts of administering cocaine and heroin. The National Enquirer reporters refused to testify at the subsequent trial and were threatened with incarceration by Judge Brian Crahan; however, he later vacated the contempt order.

After the police released her on March 5, 1982, the morning after Belushi's death, Smith went to St. Louis on the advice of her lawyer, Robert Sheahen, to avoid reporters. Discovered there, she flew back to Los Angeles. Then she traveled to New York and eventually returned to Toronto. Smith ultimately returned to the United States in June 1986, where she accepted a plea bargain by pleading no contest to involuntary manslaughter and several drug charges. She served 15 months in prison at California Institution for Women between December 1986 and March 1988. She was deported to Canada after her release and moved to Toronto, where she worked as a legal secretary and spoke to teenagers about the dangers of drugs.

Smith was arrested in Vancouver, British Columbia in July 1991 with two grams of heroin in her purse, for which she received a fine of CDN$2000 and 12 months' probation. She appeared in the E! True Hollywood Story episode on Belushi's death, which first aired in 1998.

== Death ==
Smith died on August 16, 2020, in Maple Ridge, British Columbia, at the age of 73. According to The Globe and Mail, she had been on oxygen and in failing health for the previous few years.
