= The Last Voyage of the Starship Enterprise =

- Saturday Night Live episode
- John Belushi parodying William Shatner as Captain James T. Kirk giving the Vulcan salute in the sketch.
- Episode no.: Season 1 Episode 22
- Written by: Michael O'Donoghue
- Original air date: May 29, 1976
- Running time: 12 minutes

Guest appearance
- Elliott Gould

"The Last Voyage of the Starship Enterprise" is a comedy sketch that first aired on May 29, 1976, during episode 22 of the first season of the NBC variety show, Saturday Night Live. The twelve-minute sketch was written by Michael O'Donoghue during a month-long process consulting with actor John Belushi. The sketch is a satire of the 1969 cancellation of Star Trek. The set design featured an effective replica of the bridge of the USS Enterprise. Dress rehearsal was difficult, with the writer doubting whether Belushi was able to pull off an effective parody of William Shatner's performance as Captain James Kirk. However, the result was a success, and O'Donoghue immediately congratulated Belushi after his performance and reflected that he had perfectly parodied Shatner as Kirk.

The sketch became a cult classic hit among Star Trek and science fiction fans. The 1977 book Saturday Night Live, edited by Anne Beatts and John Head, included a copy of a note from Star Trek creator Gene Roddenberry praising the comedic bit. The sketch was released on a 1985 Saturday Night Live compilation VHS that featured The Best of John Belushi and re-released with the same title in DVD format in 2011. In his book Metapop, author Michael Dunne called the comedic bit among the most well-known of all Saturday Night Live routines. The Chicago Sun-Times referred to it as an intelligent satire of Star Trek. The Los Angeles Times placed the parody among the program's top ten sketches of all-time. On the series' 40th anniversary, Tulsa World listed the sketch as one of the television show's most iconic.

The New Yorker film critic Anthony Lane wrote that Belushi was flawless and captured Shatner's essence while adding simultaneously his own layer of weariness to the character. The Hollywood Reporter interviewed Tom Hanks and Elliott Gould in 2015; Gould called the sketch a favorite, while Hanks placed it among the best five of all time. In ranking every single Saturday Night Live cast member by talent in 2015, Rolling Stone called the Captain Kirk parody one of Belushi's most memorable and wrote that it was evidence of the actor's youthful innocence.

== Plot synopsis ==
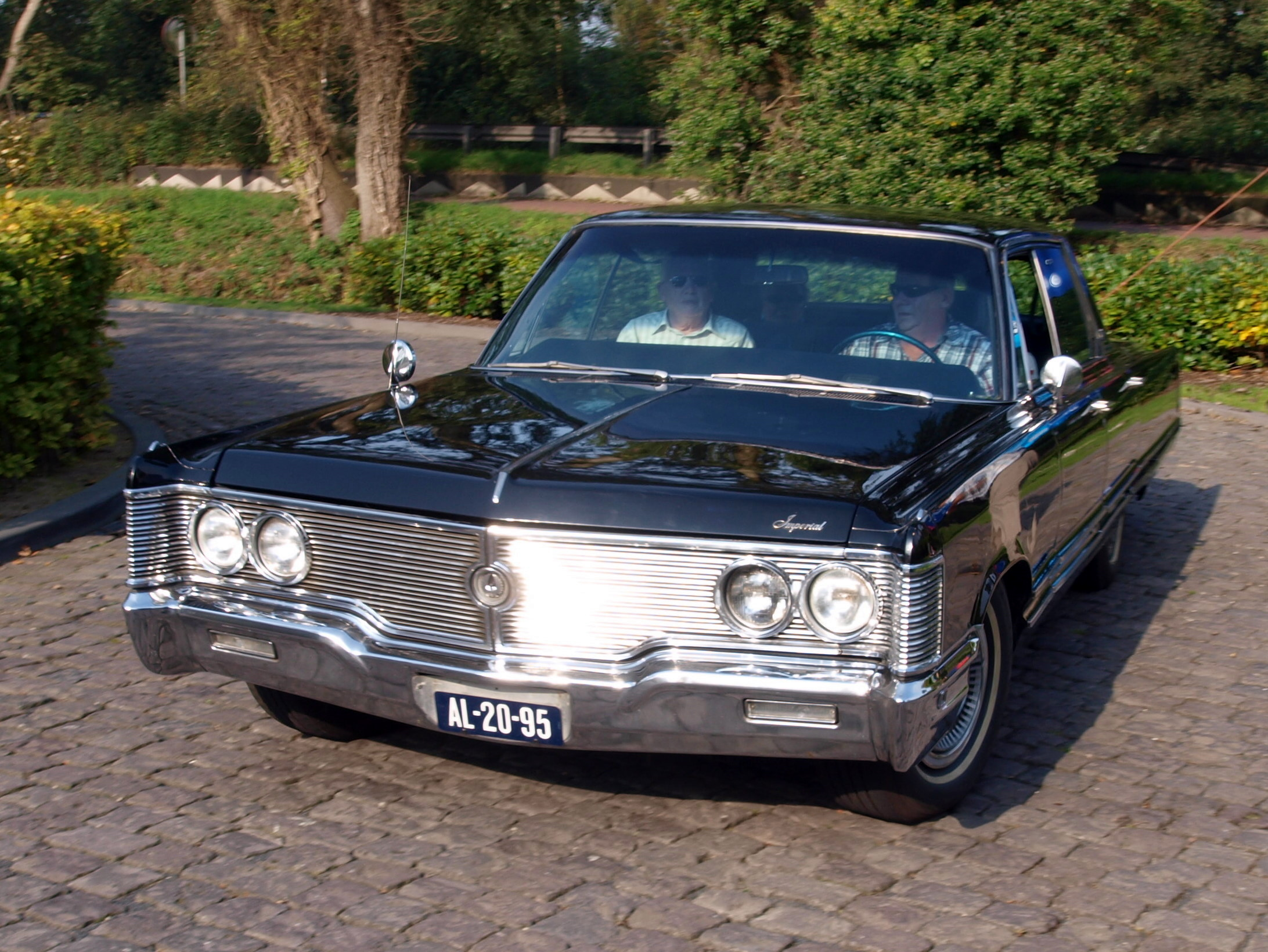
A strange alien spacecraft following the USS Enterprise is identified as a 1968 Chrysler Imperial

The sensors of the starship USS Enterprise pick up a strange alien spacecraft following it in hot pursuit. Spock, played by Chevy Chase, identifies it as a 1968 Chrysler Imperial with a tinted windshield and retractable headlights. The automobile is registered to NBC, a company that, according to the ship computer, may have previously made cookies.

Captain Kirk, played by John Belushi, orders evasive maneuvers to outrun the strange craft. Unable to do so, he declares "Red Alert" and orders the firing of phasers and photon torpedoes to destroy the craft. Unfortunately, all of the ship's equipment fails for no reason and the Enterprise's systems rapidly break down. Suddenly, Dr. Leonard McCoy, played by Dan Aykroyd, runs onto the bridge saying that the aliens are on the ship. He says they did not beam aboard but merely "walked out from behind the curtains".

It turns out that the aliens are NBC executive Herb Goodman, played by Elliott Gould, and his associate Curtis, played by Garrett Morris. They announce that the Star Trek series has been cancelled. Kirk and his officers discharge their phasers at Goodman, but nothing happens. Spock declares that the "alien" must have a "weapons de-activator" and tries to employ his famous Vulcan nerve pinch on him, but that does not work either. The executive, unfazed by the actors refusing to break character, pulls Spock's ears off and throws them away. Spock then mind-melds with Goodman only to discover that, as he describes it, "It was all dark and empty in there, and there were little mice in the corners. I kept bumping my head on the ceiling...!" Whereupon Kirk slaps him back to his senses.

Other NBC executives and staff show up and dismantle the Enterprise set. The other crew members accept the cancellation and leave, but Shatner and Nimoy try to hang on to their Star Trek personae as Kirk and Spock. However, Nimoy is eventually reduced to a sobbing, nervous wreck, and is carried off the set by Curtis. Shatner remains defiantly in the Captain's chair, as Goodman mentions to Shatner that he got a phone call from a margarine company. (Note: At the time this sketch was transmitted, William Shatner was a commercial spokesman for Promise margarine.)

Finally, the set is completely dismantled, and still in his chair, Shatner, as Captain Kirk, makes a final entry into his log recalling his previous three years of space exploration, concluding: "And except for one television network, we have found intelligence everywhere in the galaxy." Raising his hand in the Vulcan salute, he goes on, "Live long and prosper". Then he brings his fingers together, his hand still raised, and adds, "Promise". (Note: The "Promise" again refers to the Promise margarine company.)

== Production ==
=== Writing ===
The twelve-minute sketch was written by Michael O'Donoghue who wanted to create a scene to showcase the acting talents of John Belushi. O'Donoghue had been the one who had initially persuaded producer Lorne Michaels to hire Belushi for the new Saturday Night Live program. O'Donoghue and Belushi recognized that the original Star Trek series itself was not a ratings success during its initial run, but had become much more successful during syndication. Belushi enjoyed the Star Trek series and wanted the part of Captain Kirk. He demonstrated his intense desire to get the role by trimming his distinctive sideburns to closely resemble Kirk's facial appearance in the original series. They worked together on the sketch for thirty days and scheduled it for the final episode of the 1976 season of the show, hosted by Elliott Gould.

=== Cast ===
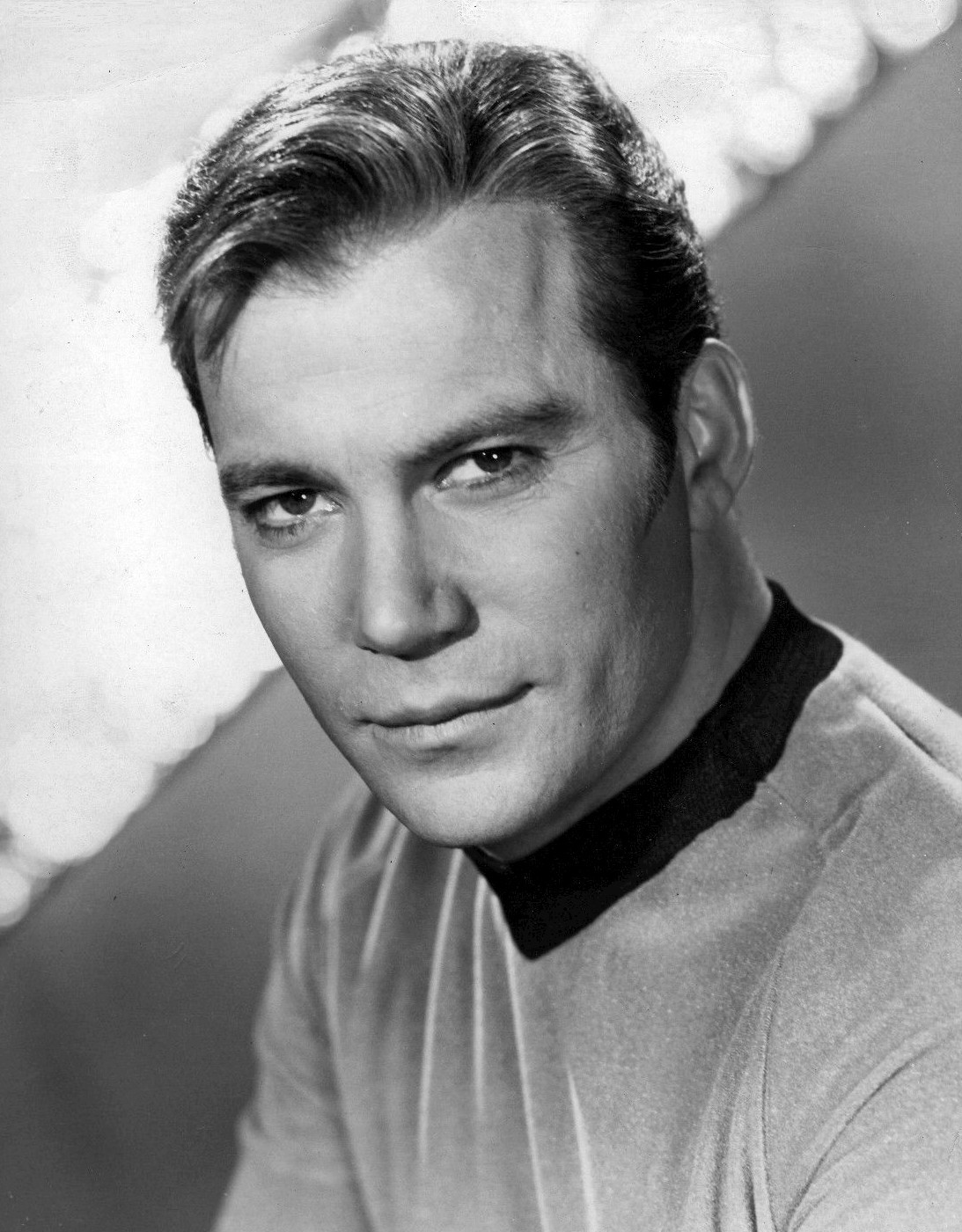
Belushi modified his sideburns to resemble William Shatner as Capt. James T. Kirk. (Shatner pictured) from Star Trek: The Original Series.

- John Belushi as Captain Kirk/William Shatner
- Chevy Chase as Mr. Spock/Leonard Nimoy
- Dan Aykroyd as Dr. Leonard McCoy/DeForest Kelley and the voice of Scotty on intercom
- Elliott Gould as Herb Goodman, NBC Executive
- Garrett Morris as Curtis, Head NBC stage crew
- Leo "Akira" Yoshimura as Mr. Sulu/George Takei
- Doris Powell as Lt. Uhura/Nichelle Nichols

=== Set design ===
The production staff had reproduced an effective-looking replica of the bridge of the USS Enterprise. As the scene began, the viewscreen of the ship depicted the USS Enterprise being pursued by a type of automobile commonly manufactured in the United States and from the time period when Star Trek was cancelled.

=== Dress rehearsal ===
Dress rehearsal for the sketch went poorly. Belushi in particular struggled to memorize his lines while delivering a believable yet humorous imitation of William Shatner's original performance, especially after having to sit still for several hours while being made up to look the part. Sketch writer O'Donoghue was worried that the sketch was too long and might not go over well with the audience. He knew that Belushi was a fan of Star Trek, and had previously rescued sketches that others thought would flop, but O'Donoghue was nervous that the actor was not able to pull off a comedic performance on this occasion.

O'Donoghue complained directly to Belushi that he thought his parody of Shatner during the dress rehearsals was inadequate and needed much improvement. Further, actor Chevy Chase was annoyed that he was satirizing Leonard Nimoy as Spock; he did not like the idea of playing second-fiddle to Belushi. During all of the rehearsals, Chase attempted to attract more attention to his character's role and dominate the scene. Just prior to the on-air performance of the sketch, O'Donoghue admonished Belushi and implored him to perform an effective parody. Belushi's dress rehearsal performance had worried executives so much that they had discussed canceling the entire sketch altogether.

=== Release ===
Jim Belushi and Lorne Michaels

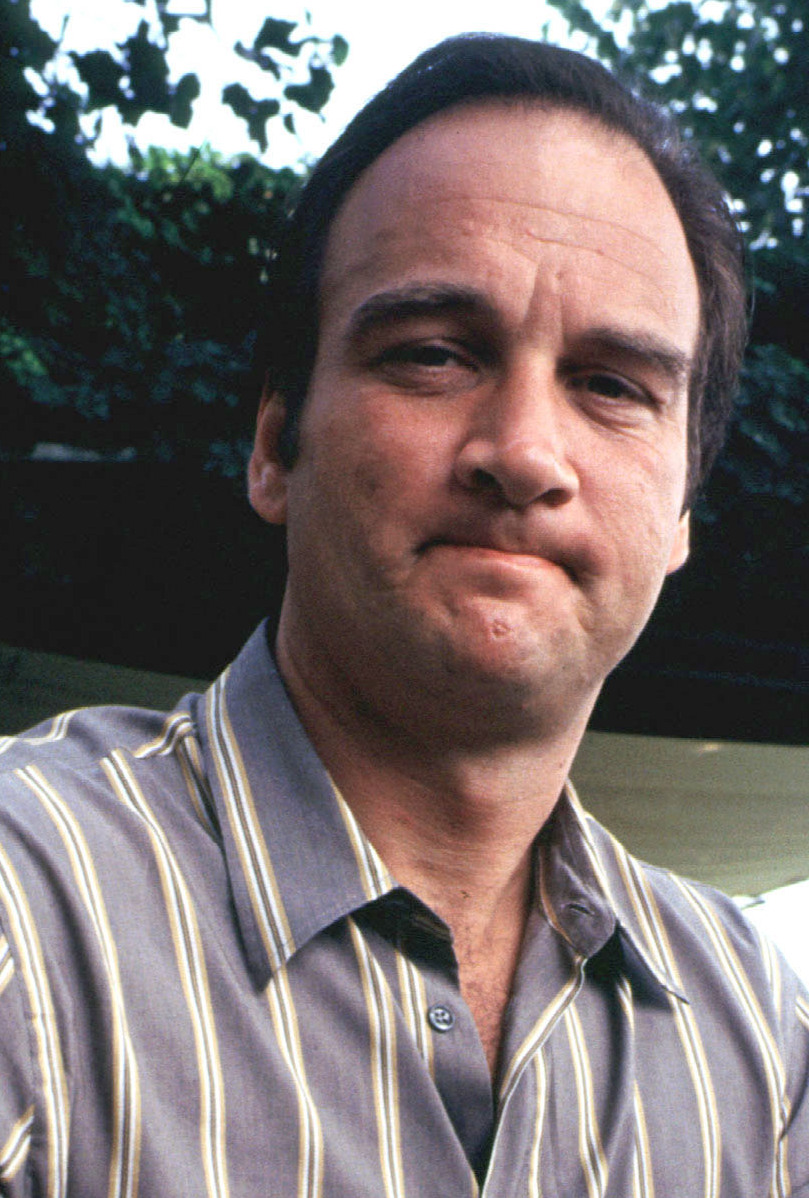
Jim Belushi

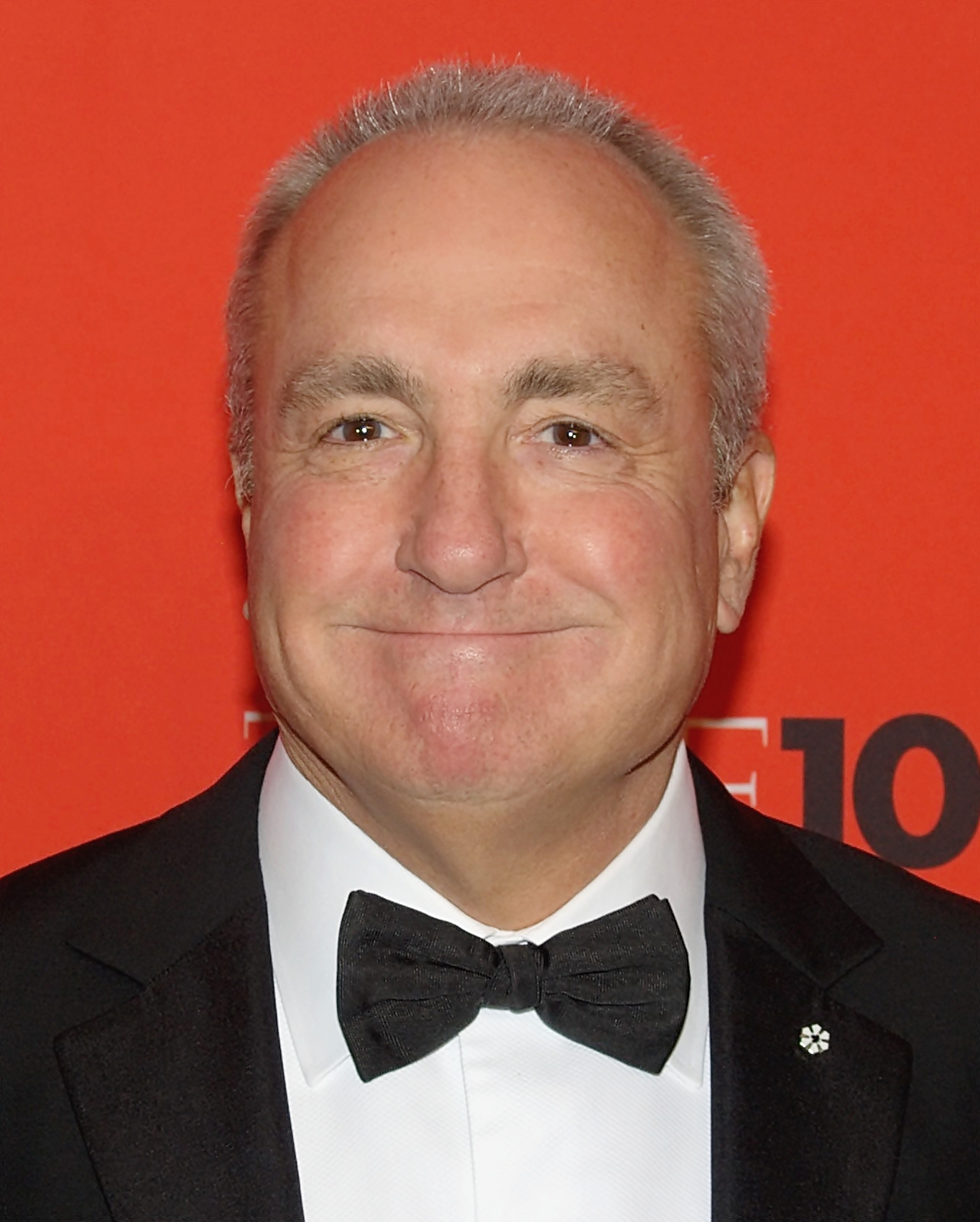
Lorne Michaels

Saturday Night Live producer Lorne Michaels assisted Belushi's brother Jim Belushi and widow Judith Jacklin Belushi in selecting the sketch to appear on The Best of John Belushi.

"The Last Voyage of the Starship Enterprise" first aired during episode 22 of the first season of Saturday Night Live on May 29, 1976.

Immediately upon the conclusion of the sketch, writer Michael O'Donoghue knew it was a success. He had been watching the Saturday Night Live performance from beside the set, off-camera. He felt that Belushi had performed his role as Captain Kirk perfectly. As soon as Belushi left the set, O'Donoghue went over to him and gave the actor a congratulatory hug. On reflection, after the live performance, O'Donoghue stated that Belushi had performed a perfect parody of Shatner as Kirk. Belushi felt it was one of his most satisfying performances.

In their book Saturday Night: A Backstage History of Saturday Night Live, authors Doug Hill and Jeff Weingrad wrote that the sketch was writer Michael O'Donoghue's signature success on the television program. In addition, they noted that the staff of Saturday Night Live felt the sketch was among the best routines on the program.

After Belushi's sudden death by drug overdose in 1982, Judith Jacklin Belushi, the actor's widow, began to think about putting together a video to commemorate him. The sketch was included on the 1985 Saturday Night Live release of 16 sketches featuring Belushi called The Best of John Belushi, produced by Lorne Michaels and Judith Jacklin Belushi, sold by Warner Home Video in VHS format.

Together, Lorne Michaels, Belushi's brother Jim Belushi, and Judith Jacklin Belushi, reviewed the actor's comedic sketches from Saturday Night Live to select what were generally considered his best works. In an interview with the Los Angeles Daily News on the 1985 VHS release, Belushi's widow commented she was not sure if her husband had a particular sketch he liked the most, but that he considered the Star Trek parody among his favorites. The Best of John Belushi edition in VHS format sold approximately 200,000 copies. It reached number three on Billboard's Top Videocassettes Sales Chart in February 1986.

The DVD edition of the collected shorts video release by Saturday Night Live was released in 2011, again under the title The Best of John Belushi.

== Themes ==
Writing for American Humor, academic Robert G. Pielke observed that the sketch was a very well-done, and moving, reflection on NBC management's fealty to Nielsen ratings and profit. Pielke went on to analyze the sketch and characterized it as an example of Saturday Night Live resisting conformist authority. He commented that an injustice had been wrought by NBC the company, whereas the NBC executives who came to shut down Star Trek were simply pawns in the process. He posited that the USS Enterprise crew members were against cancelling the television program because their self-worth had become tied to it. Pielke noted that within the confines of the sketch's plot itself, as each crew member realized there was no option other than cancellation, they each showed their identity and humanity.

Pielke praised the final scene of the sketch as evocative of the original series and an indictment of capitalism. He wrote that Belushi finished off the sketch with a moving rendition of the introduction to the original Star Trek series, while modifying it slightly to emphasize that NBC's greed had ended the Enterprise mission.

Mother Jones magazine additionally commented upon the key theme of satire over conflict between the critical success of Star Trek and the decision to cancel the program by the studio executives. The magazine noted that writer Michael O'Donoghue's work for the sketch was among the highest caliber scripts he had written for Saturday Night Live. Mother Jones found it ironic that in the sketch the Enterprise was defeated not by its traditional enemies such as the Klingons, but by a stupid NBC executive in charge of the network's programming schedule.

Upon re-release of the sketch on the Saturday Night Live compilation DVD titled The Best of John Belushi, Jon Corey wrote for Inside Pulse that the sketch was still one of ten best ever on Saturday Night Live. He pointed out the irony that it was not Khan Noonien Singh or the Klingons that defeated the Enterprise, but an enemy much more powerful — NBC executives. Nick Hartel reviewed the DVD release for DVD Talk, and commented that the sketch's satire succeeded because it was a surreal form of meta-comedy that dared to criticize NBC management.

The New Yorker film critic Anthony Lane reflected on the sketch and Belushi's performance in 2013. Lane thought that the sketch was an effective satire of the cancellation of the series and simultaneously served as a death knell for the Star Trek franchise. He felt that viewers watching the sketch in 1976 would be hard-pressed to imagine a future, thirty-seven-years later, where Star Trek was so thoroughly ensconced within popular culture. Lane wrote that Belushi was flawless in his role parodying Shatner playing Kirk. He observed that Belushi both performed an effective parody, while simultaneously injecting his own weariness into the Kirk character. Lane wondered how the Star Trek franchise could ever come back from the total deconstruction the SNL skit presented.

== Impact on Star Trek ==
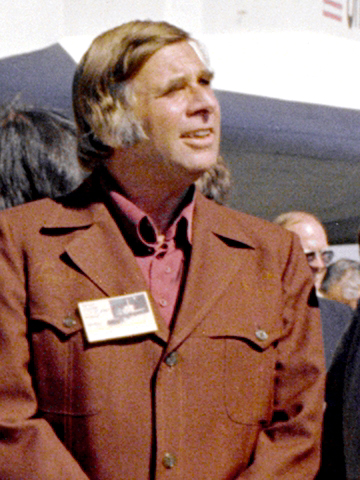
Star Trek creator Gene Roddenberry wrote a letter to Elliott Gould in which he called the sketch "delicious".

"I like Belushi's work as Kirk better than my own."

— William Shatner

The sketch became a cult classic hit among Star Trek and science fiction fans. Captain Kirk actor William Shatner was asked which Star Trek parody was his favorite: Belushi's impression of himself, or the later satire wherein Shatner appeared on Saturday Night Live in a sketch telling Star Trek fans known as Trekkies to "Get a life". Shatner said he preferred Belushi's impression to his own later appearance on the comedy television program. Shatner commented: "I like Belushi's work as Kirk better than my own".

DeForest Kelley, the actor who portrayed physician Leonard McCoy on Star Trek, was a personal favorite of John Belushi. Belushi had offices on the same lot as Kelley. Kelley overheard Belushi discussing the Saturday Night Live parody of Star Trek with William Shatner, and mentioned to both of them that he had not yet seen the sketch. Belushi immediately escorted Kelley to his office on the lot and had him watch it on videotape.

Kelley thoroughly enjoyed it, especially Belushi's impression of Captain Kirk. He later remarked that he had trouble going back to act on the Star Trek set in a scene opposite Shatner because he could not stop laughing remembering the Saturday Night Live parody and Belushi's portrayal. Belushi later gave Kelley a signed videotape of the sketch; he had written "Live Long and Prosper" on the tape. Kelley sent the videotape to close friends when Belushi died because he did not want to hold on to the memento which brought up sad memories of his loss.

The 1977 book Saturday Night Live, edited by Anne Beatts and John Head, includes the complete script of the sketch, as well as a message from Star Trek creator Gene Roddenberry in which he effusively praised the sketch.

Roddenberry had sent a letter to Elliott Gould on June 3, 1976, in which he thanked the actor for the parody and said he would show it to members of the Star Trek cast. Roddenberry called the sketch creatively designed with the light comedic touch necessary to pull off an effective satire. Elliott Gould later told The Hollywood Reporter that the success of the sketch inspired Roddenberry to create the first feature film version of his series: Star Trek: The Motion Picture.

Yoshimura, who has been a production designer on SNL for the entirety of its run, has been pressed into service to play Sulu whenever the show did a Star Trek spoof—most recently on the Season 42 episode that aired on May 6, 2017—a full 41 years after the original parody.

== Reception ==
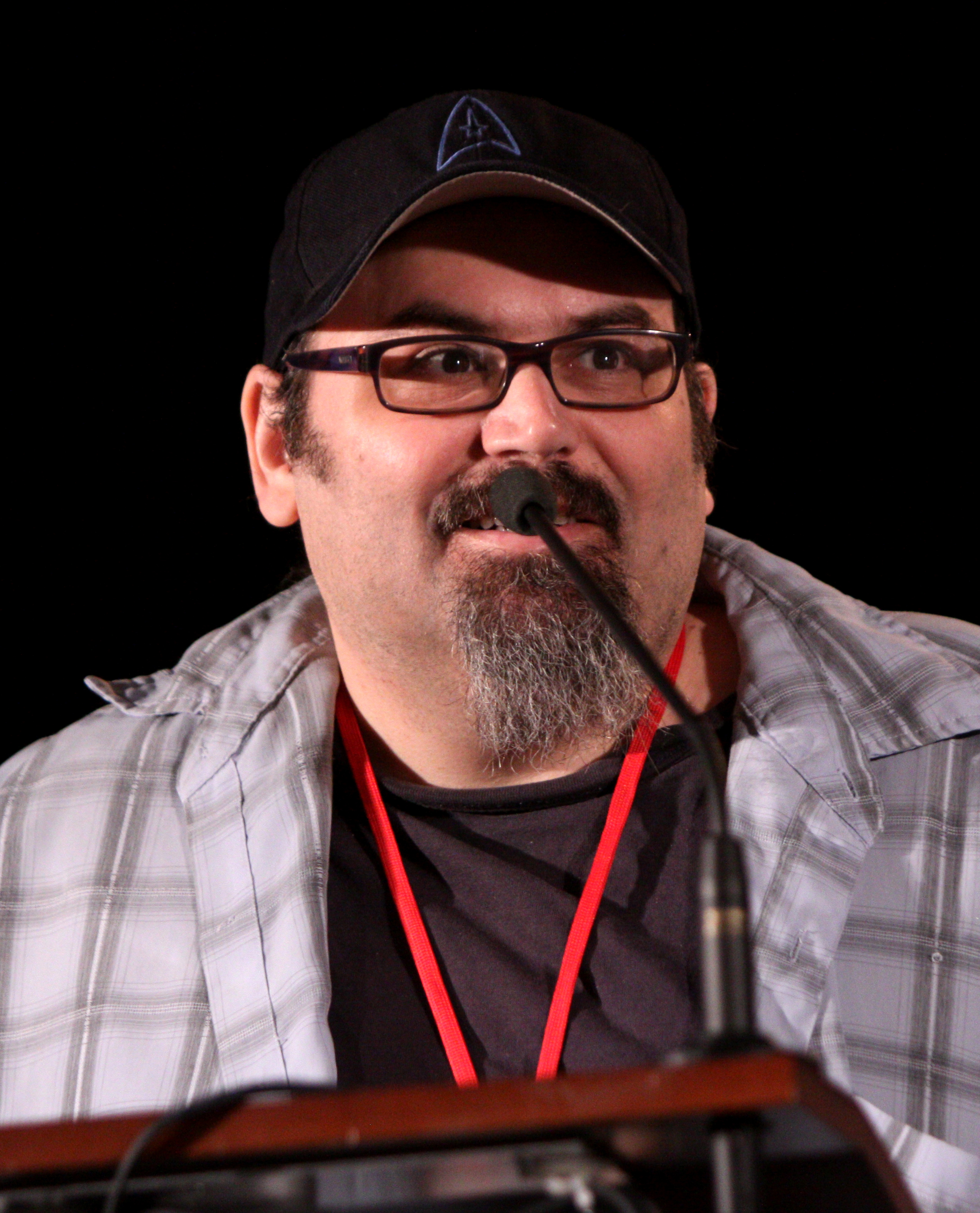
Founder of TrekMovie.com Anthony Pascale called the comedy bit: "one of the best Star Trek parody sketches of all time".

In reviewing The Best of John Belushi when Saturday Night Live released the compilation to VHS in 1985, The New York Times critic Fred Ferretti highlighted Belushi's role as Captain James Kirk among the actor's memorable performances. In his 1992 book, Metapop: Self-referentiality in Contemporary American Popular Culture, author Michael Dunne called the comedic bit: "one of SNL's most famous sketches". The Los Angeles Times called the sketch one of the television program's most noteworthy of all time. In a 1999 article reflecting on the 25th anniversary of Saturday Night Live, Los Angeles Times journalist Susan Keller placed the Star Trek parody at number eight on a list of the program's top ten all-time sketches.

In a contribution to the 2001 compilation book Faith, Reason, and Political Life Today, Paul A. Cantor calls the sketch among the best of Star Trek parodies, saying it is "hysterical". A 2005 article by journalist Darel Jevens, writing for the Chicago Sun-Times, called the sketch an intelligent satire of Star Trek. Reflecting on Belushi's impact 25 years after the actor's death, a 2007 Associated Press article noted that the parody of Captain Kirk, Bluto from Animal House and the Saturday Night Live Samurai were among the characters that illustrated his acting versatility.

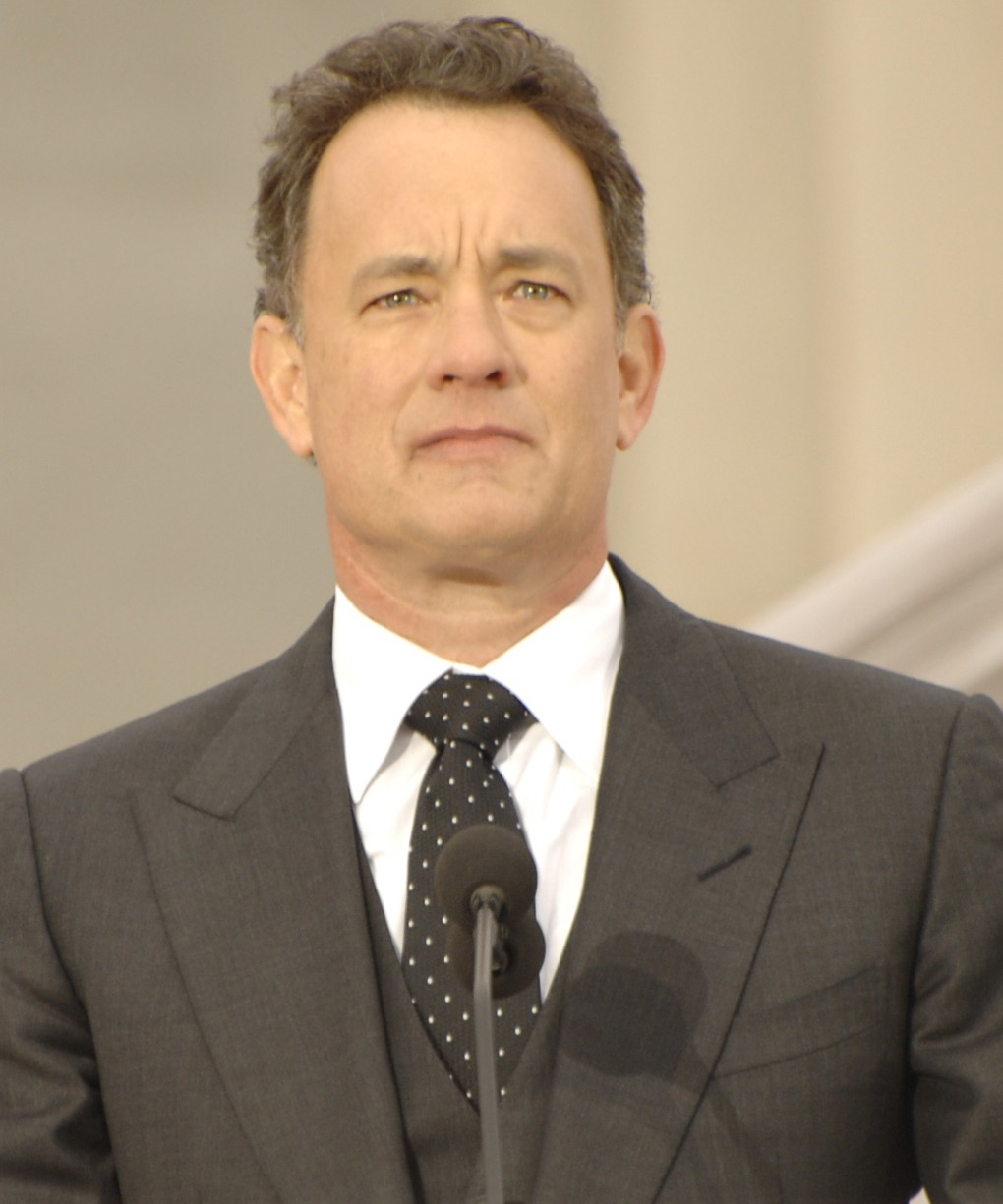
Actor Tom Hanks said of the sketch: "that's got to be one of the top five of all."

In a 2008 article published by Huffpost TV, columnist Richard Keller characterized the sketch as one of the most well-known satires of Star Trek; the other being another Saturday Night Live episode where William Shatner appeared playing himself. Los Angeles Times film critic Betsy Sharkey wrote that Belushi's performance was so nuanced and full of depth, because he was able to skillfully rely upon the depth that William Shatner had given to the character's prior portrayals. It was described by TrekMovie.com founder Anthony Pascale as "one of the best Star Trek parody sketches of all time".

Reflecting on the life of John Belushi for a 2012 article, WOMC placed the sketch among those regarded as the most well-remembered and loved performances by the actor. In his 2012 book Star Trek: The Complete Unauthorized History, author Robert Greenberger called the piece a classic. In a September 2013 article for The A.V. Club, Phil Dyess-Nugent described "The Last Voyage Of The Starship Enterprise" as lovable in-depth satire of Star Trek with a touching impression of Shatner that was likely the best routine from the first year of Saturday Night Live. In a subsequent review of the episode in an October 2013, Dyess-Nugent again praised the sketch, writing that it was an outstanding work both as a form of humor and a tribute to Star Trek fans.

Writing for CNN in 2014, journalist Todd Leopold commented that he appreciated the sketch, but did not place it among the program's five all-time sketches. Time magazine included the sketch in a retrospective on classic Saturday Night Live works, placing the comedic bit among the most iconic from the program's first years on television. On the 40th anniversary of Saturday Night Live, Tulsa World placed the sketch among "16 iconic skits".

In his 2015 book John Prine: In Spite of Himself, author Eddie Huffman wrote that the Captain Kirk role, along with his portrayal of Samurai warrior, and Marlon Brando as the Godfather, helped John Belushi become famous and an acting sensation. In a 2015 The Hollywood Reporter interview with actors Tom Hanks and Elliott Gould, Gould called the sketch one of his favorites, and Hanks remarked: "Oh, I think that's got to be one of the top five of all." Rolling Stone ranked every single one of the 141 cast members of Saturday Night Live in order of talent. John Belushi was ranked at number one, with Rolling Stone citing his Captain Kirk parody as evidence of his youthful innocence among his often lunatic-like performances in a 2015 article. The website Rotten Tomatoes characterized the sketch as a satire that did not lose its effectiveness with age.

== See also ==
- Galaxy Quest
- The Man Who Came to Be Dinner
- Why Must I Be a Crustacean in Love?
- Where No Fan Has Gone Before
