= Belushi: A Biography =

- Cover photo
- Author: Judith Belushi Pisano; Tanner Colby
- Language: English
- Subject: John Belushi
- Genre: Biography
- Publisher: Rugged Land, LLC
- Publication date: November 1, 2005
- Publication place: United States
- Media type: Print (Hardback)
- Pages: 288 (Hardback)
- ISBN: 1-59071-048-7
- OCLC: 61476991
- Dewey Decimal: 792.702/8092 22
- LC Class: PN2287.B423 B43 2005

Belushi: A Biography is an oral history biography of John Belushi, written and collaborated by John's widow, Judith Belushi Pisano and co-author Tanner Colby, with an introduction by Dan Aykroyd. Filled with anecdotes and interviews from John's personal friends, fellow Saturday Night Live alumni, and film co-stars, it is a non-objective, positive portrayal of the actor's life and influence.

The anecdotes and narrative text are interspersed with both familiar and rare photos of the actor provided by Pisano, the Belushi family, and various friends. Many of the photos previously provided in Wired and Samurai Widow are seen here in color.

The film Belushi is based on it.
