= Wired (book) =

1984 book by Bob Woodward

- Cover photo
- Author: Bob Woodward
- Cover artist: George Corsillo
- Language: English
- Subject: John Belushi
- Genre: Biography
- Publisher: Simon & Schuster (Hardback), Pocket Books (Mass-market Paperback)
- Publication date: 1984
- Publication place: United States
- Media type: Print (Hardback, Mass-market Paperback)
- Pages: 461 (Hardback)
- ISBN: 0-671-47320-4
- OCLC: 10605685
- Dewey Decimal: 792.7/028/0924 B 19
- LC Class: PN2287.B423 W66 1984

Wired: The Short Life and Fast Times of John Belushi is a 1984 non-fiction book by American journalist Bob Woodward about actor and comedian John Belushi. The hardcover edition includes 16 pages of black-and-white photos, front and back.

== Interviews ==
Many friends and relatives of Belushi, including his widow Judith Belushi Pisano, Dan Aykroyd, and James Belushi, agreed to be interviewed at length for the book, but later felt the final product was exploitative and not representative of the John Belushi they knew. Pisano wrote her own book, Samurai Widow (1990), to counter the image of Belushi portrayed in Wired.

== Reception ==
In 2013, Tanner Colby, who co-authored the 2005 book Belushi: A Biography with Pisano, wrote about how Wired exposes Woodward's strengths and weaknesses as a journalist. While in the process of researching the anecdotes related in the book, he found that while many of them were true, Woodward missed, or didn't seek out, their meaning or context.

For example, in Woodward's telling, a "lazy and undisciplined" Belushi is guided through the scene on the cafeteria line in Animal House by director John Landis, yet other actors present for that scene recall how much of it was improvised by the actor in one single take. Blair Brown told author Tanner Colby that Woodward had "tricked" her into describing her and Belushi’s preparation for a love scene in Continental Divide, and Brown remained angry at Woodward years later while telling the story of Woodward’s deceitfulness. Colby notes that Woodward devotes a single paragraph to Belushi's grandmother's funeral, where he hit a low point and resolved to get clean for the filming of Continental Divide, while Woodward diligently documented every instance of drug abuse over a period of many years that he turned up. "It's like someone wrote a biography of Michael Jordan in which all the stats and scores are correct, but you come away with the impression that Michael Jordan wasn't very good at playing basketball," Colby concluded.

Dan Aykroyd denounced Wired publicly. Interviewed on television by Bobbie Wygant for NBC 5 in 1984, Aykroyd responded to the question of whether Woodward had interviewed him before writing the book:

[Woodward] spoke with me about an hour and a half, and you know there's things in [the book] I don't remember saying to him, and first of all, the book, I've skimmed through excerpts of it, it's really pulpy and trashy, it's not well-written at all, and Bob Woodward...here was a man with a very respectable career - All the President's Men, The Brethren, and his research and newspaper work - and all of a sudden he does a book called The Short Life and Fast Times of John Belushi, what a kind of a cheap, you know... He's just stepping down into that seedy world, and I think he's really avoided many issues in the book. He certainly has avoided the issue of what a funbag John was, what a great guy he was, what a warm, humorous, really, you know...concerned, and bright, educated, well-read individual this guy was. How did he get to be so successful? He was smart, you know, he wasn't just given his break, and he had to work for what he had, and Woodward completely skirts that, and it's a depressing, sordid, tragic book, he jumps around the issue of the police probe, and the fact that some of the people that were purveying drugs to John were friends of police force members in Los Angeles, and this is something that he wimped out on, and I've heard that he really didn't write most of the book, that it was John Anderson, his researcher, who put down most of the material on paper, and for my part I just think that it's very depressing summer reading.

Woodward publicly credited journalist John Ward Anderson, whom Aykroyd claimed wrote most of Wired, with assistance in the writing of the book, stating in its foreword, "John Ward Anderson, a 1981 Harvard graduate, assisted me in all aspects of producing this book – its conception, research, writing and organization. His role could not have been greater. He is a dedicated journalist and tireless worker. This book is as much his as it is mine."

Bill Murray, on an episode of The Joe Rogan Experience, criticized Woodward's reliance on sources "far outside [Belushi's] inner circle" and revealed he was approached to be interviewed but turned it down because it "smelled funny."

Murray called the book "criminal" and "cruel" and it "tore down my friend... Just the title alone. It was cold.” Murray also stated,

I read like five pages of Wired, and I went, ‘Oh my God. They framed Nixon... If this is what he writes about my friend that I’ve known, you know, for half of my adult life, which is completely inaccurate, talking to like, the people of the outer, outer circle, getting the story – what the hell could they have done to Nixon?... You’re telling me that that guy over there, that guy who’s that far away from the center of things, is telling you the facts about John Belushi? That guy way the f–k over there is telling you who John Belushi is?... I acknowledge I only read five pages, but the five pages I read made me want to set fire to the whole thing... [Woodward]’s gonna have to answer for that sometime.

Murray and Woodward reportedly exchanged “tense” words over Wired when they came face-to-face at the Kennedy Center in 2025.

== Film adaptation ==
The book was later adapted into a critically panned 1989 feature film also called Wired, in which Belushi was played by Michael Chiklis and Woodward was played by J.T. Walsh.
