= Billy Goat Tavern =

Restaurant chain based in Chicago, Illinois, U.S.

Coordinates: 41.890284°N 87.624488°W

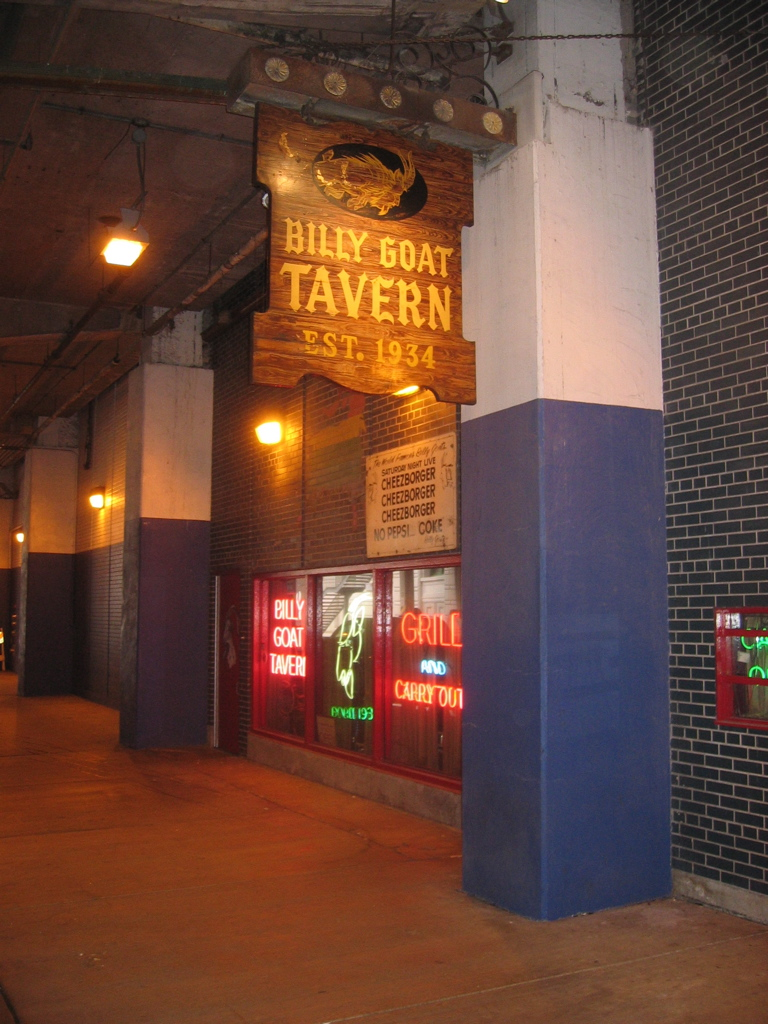
- Billy Goat Tavern on Michigan Avenue
- Interactive map of Billy Goat Tavern

Restaurant information
- Established: 1934; 92 years ago
- Previous owners: William "Billy Goat" Sianis; Sam Sianis
- Food type: North American cuisine
- Location: Lower, 430 Michigan Ave, Chicago, Illinois, 60611, United States
- Other locations: 7 other locations
- Website: billygoattavern.com

The Billy Goat Tavern is a chain of taverns located in Chicago, Illinois. Its restaurants are based on the original Billy Goat Tavern founded in 1934 by Billy Sianis, a Greek immigrant. It achieved fame primarily through newspaper columns by Mike Royko, a supposed curse on the Chicago Cubs, and the Olympia Cafe sketch on Saturday Night Live.

The tavern has eight locations with seven in Chicago, including the oldest extant location on Lower Michigan Avenue, Navy Pier, the Merchandise Mart, O'Hare Airport, Midway Airport, on Lake Street (1/2 block west of Michigan Avenue), and in the West Loop on Madison Street (near the United Center); and one location in the suburban Yorktown Mall in Lombard, Illinois. They expanded to Washington, D.C., in 2005, the first location outside the Chicago metropolitan area; it is intended to appeal primarily to Chicago transplants, as well as students from the Georgetown University Law Center located across the street.

== History ==
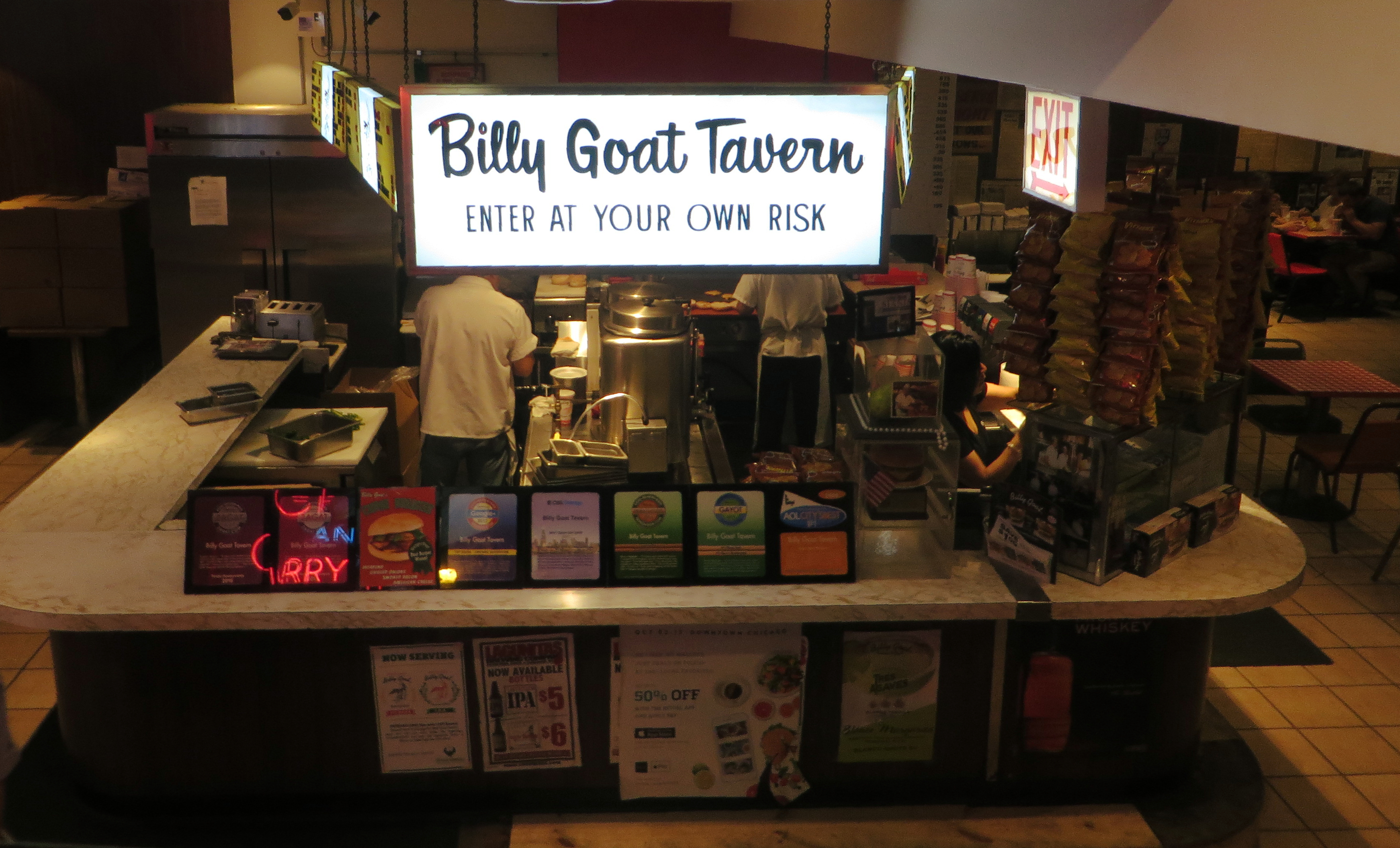
Counter and sign inside the tavern

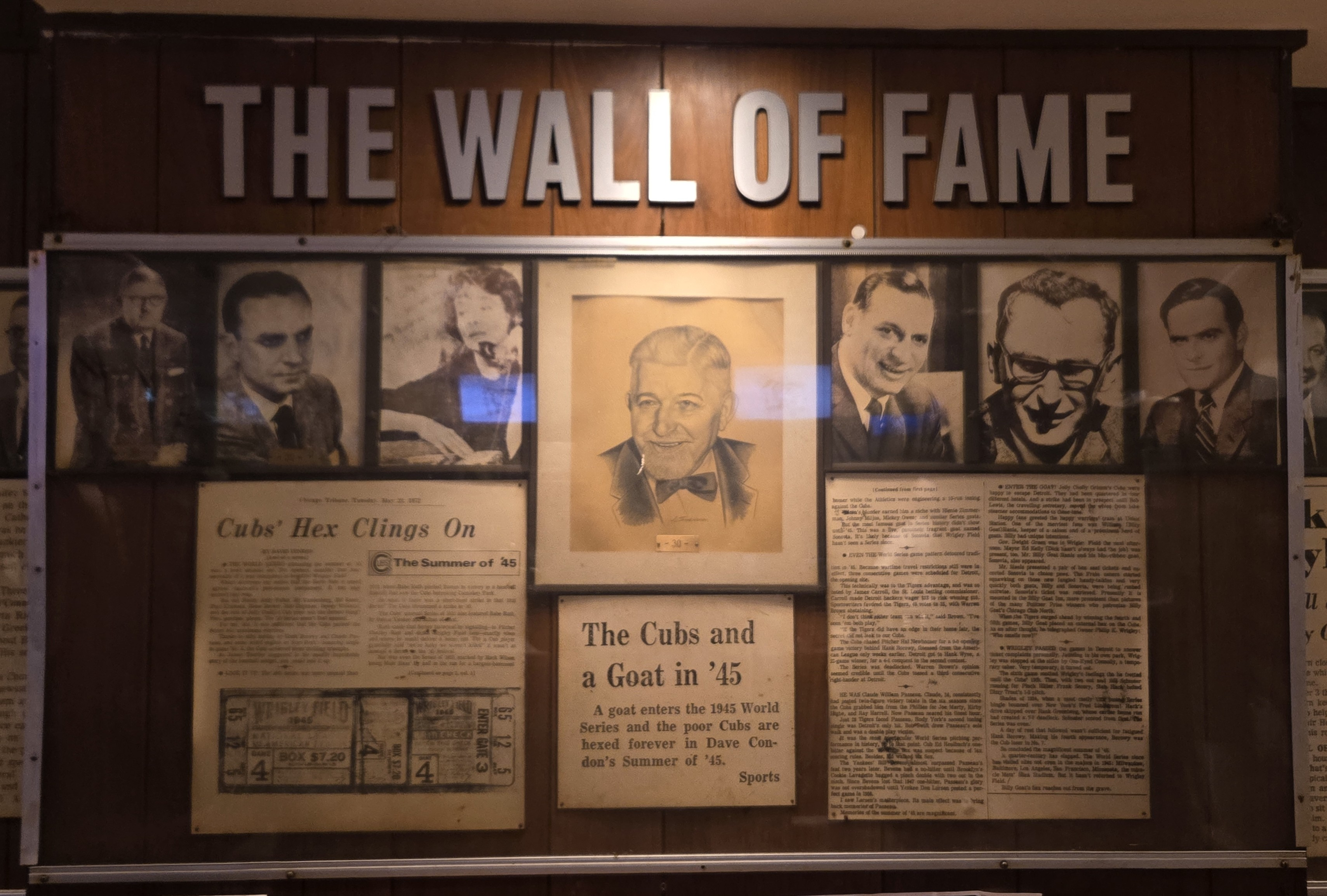
Wall of Fame

The first location, at 1855 W. Madison St., opened in 1934 when William "Billy Goat" Sianis bought the Lincoln Tavern, near Chicago Stadium, for $205 with a bounced check (the proceeds from the first weekend they were open were used to fulfill the payment). When the 1944 Republican National Convention came to town, he posted a sign saying "No Republicans allowed," causing the place to be packed with Republicans demanding service. This resulted in publicity, which Sianis used to his advantage.

In 1964, the original tavern moved to 430 N. Michigan Ave., which is actually below Michigan Avenue, made possible by Chicago's network of multilevel streets in that vicinity. Being situated between the offices of the Chicago Tribune and the old Chicago Sun-Times building led to the tavern's mention in several regular newspaper columns, particularly those of Mike Royko.

In 1970, Sianis petitioned then mayor of Chicago Richard J. Daley to issue him the first liquor license for the moon. His hope, according to the comedic letter that currently adorns the establishment's wall, was to best serve his country by serving delicious cheeseburgers to wayfaring astronauts as well as raising moon-goats. Sianis died in October 1970.

On New Year's Eve 2005, the tavern held a farewell party for the City News Service, successor to the City News Bureau of Chicago, whose reporters were a fixture at the Billy Goat for decades. A small sign commemorating America's first news agency still hangs near the northwest wall.

== Cubs curse ==
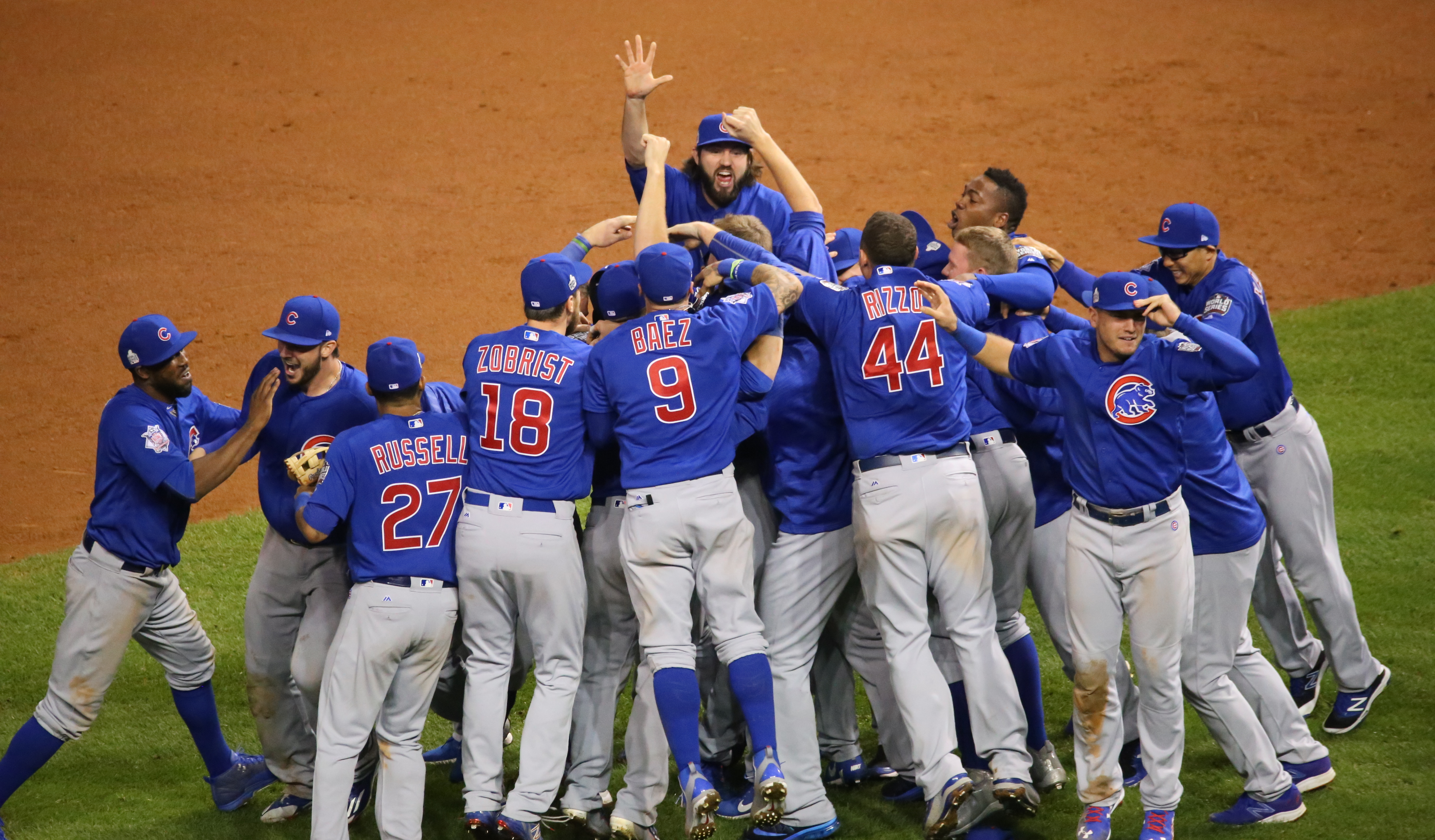
The Cubs broke the Curse of the Billy Goat by winning the 2016 World Series

The tavern is also known for its involvement in the Curse of the Billy Goat (also known as the "Cubs Curse"). Owner Sianis brought his pet goat, a tavern mascot, to Game 4 of the 1945 World Series, a home game at Wrigley Field against the Detroit Tigers. Despite paid-for box seat tickets, Cubs owner Philip K. Wrigley allegedly ejected Sianis and the goat due to the latter's odor. Supposedly, Sianis placed a curse on the team that after that year there would never be another Cubs World Series victory, saying "Them Cubs, they ain't gonna win no more." After an extended dry spell, the Cubs won the 2016 World Series.

== Olympia Café ==
Another sign reads: "Cheezborger, Cheezborger, Cheezborger. No Pepsi. Coke," These words, with Pepsi and Coke in reverse order, were originally popularized by John Belushi in "Olympia Cafe," an early Saturday Night Live sketch that was inspired by the tavern. Bill Murray and sketch writer (and bit player) Don Novello were regulars at the Billy Goat; Belushi and Murray were natives of the Chicago area, and Novello had moved to Chicago in the 1960s. However, Dan Aykroyd said that Olympia Café was not based on the Billy Goat Tavern, but rather on the café John Belushi's father owned in the 1960s, called the "Olympia". According to Jim Belushi, John Belushi based the character on their Albanian uncle, who at one time owned a hot dog stand on Chicago's Northwest Side.

== See also ==
- List of hamburger restaurants
