= Olympia Café =

Fictional greasy spoon featured in a recurring Saturday Night Live sketch

The Olympia Café is a fictional greasy spoon that was featured in a recurring Saturday Night Live sketch. The staff, led by John Belushi as Pete Dionisopoulos, were Greeks. Staff also included Bill Murray as Nico, a busboy who speaks very little English (and not in complete sentences), Dan Aykroyd as short-order cook George, and Sandy, a waitress played by Laraine Newman. Series regulars Garrett Morris, Gilda Radner, and Jane Curtin had recurring roles as regular customers.

As various guest stars discovered (with a few exceptions), only three items on the long menu could actually be ordered successfully: the cheeseburger (pronounced "cheeburger" by Belushi), chips (pronounced "cheeps"), and Pepsi (pronounced "Petsi"). Attempts to order Coke (later Pepsi) were invariably met with the retort, "No Coke! Petsi!" (or later on, "No Petsi! Coke!") Likewise, those who ordered french fries got the response, "No fries! Cheeps!" Most famously, if a customer complained about having to order a cheeseburger for breakfast saying it was too early for one, Pete would point out all the other customers enjoying said dish, e.g. "Too early for cheeburger? Look! [pointing around restaurant] Cheeburger, cheeburger, cheeburger, cheeburger, cheeburger, cheeburger, cheeburger, cheeburger, cheeburger! Eh?" The short-order cook (usually played by Dan Aykroyd) would mistake the retort as an order for more cheeseburgers, loading up an absurd number of patties onto the grill.

According to Don Novello, who penned the first Olympia Café sketch, the diner was based on the Billy Goat Tavern on Lower North Michigan Avenue in Chicago, which is still operating (and part of a small chain). According to his brother Jim Belushi, John based the character on their Albanian uncle, who at one time owned a hot dog stand on Chicago's Northwest Side. In a 2024 interview, Aykroyd said that the diner was not based on the Billy Goat Tavern, but rather on the café John Belushi's father owned in the 1960s, called the "Olympia." Olympia is a Greek town after which many restaurants have been named.

List of episodes featuring the Olympia Café:

- January 28, 1978 (Host: Robert Klein)
- March 18, 1978 (Host: Jill Clayburgh)
- May 20, 1978 (Host: Buck Henry)
- October 7, 1978 (Host: The Rolling Stones)
- December 2, 1978 (Host: Walter Matthau)
- May 26, 1979 (Host: Buck Henry)

== See also ==
- Billy Goat Tavern
- Recurring Saturday Night Live characters and sketches
- Cheeburger Cheeburger
- Cheese Shop sketch
- Smackout
- Spam (Monty Python sketch)
