= Tony Brenna =

British-American journalist and author

Tony Brenna is a British-American investigative journalist and author.
