= Belushi (film) =

2020 documentary film directed by R. J. Cutler

- Poster
- Directed by: R. J. Cutler
- Written by: R. J. Cutler
- Produced by: R. J. Cutler; John Battsek; Diane Becker; Trevor Smith
- Edited by: Maris Berzins; Joe Beshenkovsky
- Music by: Tree Adams
- Production companies: Passion Pictures; Showtime Networks; Sky Atlantic; This Machine
- Distributed by: Showtime Networks
- Release date: October 14, 2020 (Chicago International Film Festival)
- Running time: 108 minutes
- Country: United States
- Language: English

Belushi is a 2020 American documentary film about John Belushi, a comedian, actor, and singer. The film is directed, written, and produced by R. J. Cutler, based on interviews conducted for the book Belushi: A Biography by Tanner Colby.

== Production ==
Belushi's widow Judy had been initially reluctant to cooperate, but eventually agreed. She provided the filmmakers with access to her late husband's archive.

== Release ==
The film premiered on Showtime on November 22, 2020.

== Reception ==
Belushi received positive reviews from critics. On the review aggregator website Rotten Tomatoes, 91% of 65 critics' reviews are positive, with an average rating of 7.4/10. The website's consensus reads: "Affectionately chronicling John Belushi's outsized talent and personal foibles, this exhaustively-researched documentary captures both the joy and tragedy of the comedic titan's legacy." Metacritic, which uses a weighted average, assigned the film a score of 72 out of 100, based on 17 critics, indicating "generally favorable" reviews.

Owen Gleiberman of Variety called the film "meticulous and touching". Detroit-area film critic Tom Santilli wrote: "The documentary almost feels TOO close to Belushi...in that it seems to brush over some things that might seem obvious in other documentary films profiling a tragic life. For one example, the death of Belushi is not given much time at all, and sparse details are included, like how 'friend' of Belushi and his supposed dealer, Cathy Smith, actually served 15 months in a California State Prison, after pleading guilty to manslaughter for being the one that injected Belushi with a lethal dose of cocaine and heroin (known as a 'speedball'). There's also no mention of John's legacy or influence, which would have been a nice context to wrap into the film."
