= Saturday Night Live Samurai =

Fictional character

In the early years of the 1970s comedy TV show Saturday Night Live, John Belushi portrayed an archetypal samurai — he has a strong sense of honor, speaks only (mock) Japanese, and wields a katana. Sketches featuring the character showed him in different occupations that would not be expected for a samurai. He always performed his tasks perfectly, despite scaring his clients quite a few times. The character was modeled after Toshiro Mifune's character in Akira Kurosawa's Yojimbo.

Samurai Futaba would probably not have become a recurring character if not for Buck Henry's insistence that there be a second sketch featuring him when he first hosted on January 17, 1976. It is perhaps due to these origins that it became standard practice on SNL to feature a Samurai sketch every time Henry hosted, until Belushi left the cast. Except for "Samurai BMOC", each time Henry would play the same character, Mr. Dantley.

In issue #74 of Marvel Team-Up (cover dated October, 1978), Belushi (in character as Samurai Futaba) teams up with Spider-Man to duel the Marvel Comics supervillain Silver Samurai. In the story, the Silver Samurai seeks to recover a ring containing a teleportation device that had inadvertently come into Belushi's possession. An alternate version of the "Samurai Deli" sketch also appears briefly in issue #54 of The Sandman, part of a timeline where Prez Rickard becomes President of the United States and hosts the "highest-rated" episode of Saturday Night Live in history.

== List of Saturday Night Live episodes featuring Samurai Futaba ==
- "Samurai Hotel" December 13, 1975 – Belushi and his bellhop (host Richard Pryor, also portraying a samurai, the only time any other samurai was depicted) duel over who has to carry a guest's bags. Pryor smashes the front desk with his sword; The Samurai says, "Well, I can dig where you're coming from," the only words ever spoken by the character in English.
- "Samurai Delicatessen" January 17, 1976 – Mr. Dantley (host Buck Henry) waits as the Samurai makes a sandwich by severing ropes on hanging salami, slicing tomatoes in midair, and splitting bread with his skull. The two of them carry on a pleasant conversation although each speaks a different language.
- "Samurai Divorce Court" February 14, 1976 – Futaba vs. Futaba. In the Samurai world, custody cases are resolved by splitting children in half. Show regular Jane Curtin plays Futaba's wife. Host: Peter Boyle
- "Samurai Tailor" May 22, 1976 – Mr. Dantley (Buck Henry) needs a tuxedo for a wedding. The Samurai makes one for him with his katana.
- "Samurai General Practitioner" July 31, 1976 host: Kris Kristofferson
- "Samurai Stockbroker" October 30, 1976 – Belushi accidentally strikes Buck Henry, playing the client Mr. Dantley, in the forehead with a katana. On tape, Henry clearly staggers back from the blow. Afterward, Henry appeared on camera with a band-aid covering the cut on his forehead. In solidarity, for the remainder of the broadcast the rest of the cast members (including a teddy bear in one later sketch) also appeared with band-aids on their foreheads.
- "The Purple Lagoon" (during musical performance) December 11, 1976 musical guest: Frank Zappa
- "Samurai Hit Man" March 19, 1977 – Don Marsala (Dan Aykroyd) hires the Samurai to kill, as soon as possible, both Don Cornelius and Don Kirshner.
- "Samurai B.M.O.C." May 21, 1977 – The Samurai must convince Dean Bynum (Buck Henry) that he is qualified to graduate from college.
- "Samurai Dry Cleaners" October 29, 1977 host: Charles Grodin
- "Samurai Psychiatrist" November 19, 1977 – Buck Henry relates a disturbing dream.
- "Samurai Night Fever" February 25, 1978 – a parody of the film Saturday Night Fever, with the Samurai as a disco dancer. Host O.J. Simpson plays the Samurai's brother.
- "Samurai TV Repairman" May 20, 1978 – The Samurai tosses a TV set around, hits it with his sword, plunges two knives into the top grille, and the picture turns out perfect. Host: Buck Henry
- "Rollo" (during musical performance) October 21, 1978 – host: Frank Zappa
- "Samurai Optometrist" November 11, 1978 – The Samurai nearly commits seppuku when Buck Henry calls him an "optician".
- "Samurai Bakery" May 26, 1979 – host: Buck Henry Mr. Dantley (Buck Henry) buys a last-minute wedding cake, only it is not boxed. The Samurai tosses the cake in the air, and slices it to pieces as it drops behind the counter, only to pick up neatly packaged, string-tied pink boxes, which he hands to Mr. Dantley.

== See also ==
- Recurring Saturday Night Live characters and sketches
- Samurai Widow
