= John Belushi =

American comedian and actor (1949–1982)

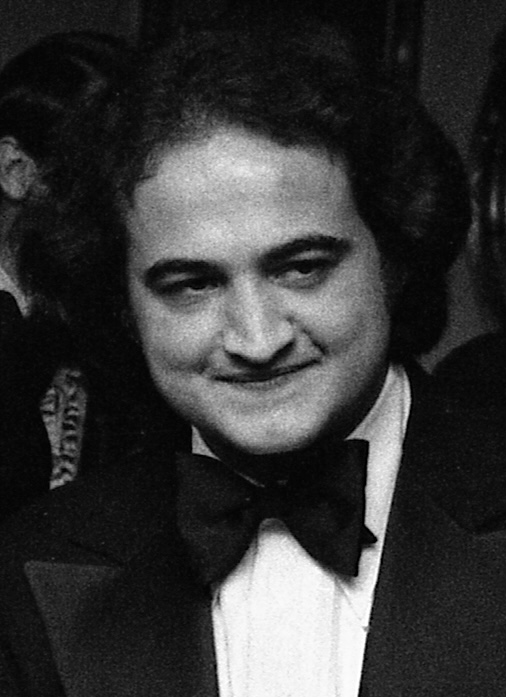
- Belushi in 1976
- Born: John Adam Belushi; January 24, 1949; Chicago, Illinois, U.S.
- Died: March 5, 1982 (aged 33); Los Angeles, California, U.S.
- Resting place: Abel's Hill Cemetery, Chilmark, Dukes County, Massachusetts, U.S.
- Occupations: Comedian; actor; musician; singer
- Years active: 1972–1982
- Known for: Saturday Night Live; Animal House; The Blues Brothers
- Spouse: Judith Jacklin (m. 1976)
- Relatives: Jim Belushi (brother); Robert Belushi (nephew)
- Awards: Emmy Award for Outstanding Writing for a Variety Series

Comedy career
- Medium: Film; television; music
- Genres: Improvisational comedy; musical comedy; physical comedy; sketch comedy

John Adam Belushi (/bəˈluːʃi/ bə-LOO-shee; January 24, 1949 – March 5, 1982) was an American comedian, actor, and musician. He was one of seven Saturday Night Live cast members of the first season. Belushi had a working partnership with Dan Aykroyd; they had first met while at Chicago's the Second City comedy club, remaining together as cast members on Saturday Night Live.

Born in Chicago to Albanian-American parents, Belushi started his own comedy troupe with Tino Insana and Steve Beshekas, called "The West Compass Trio". Bernard Sahlins recruited him for The Second City comedy club. Once there he met Aykroyd, Brian Doyle-Murray, and Harold Ramis. In 1975, Chevy Chase and Michael O'Donoghue recommended Belushi to Saturday Night Live creator and showrunner Lorne Michaels, who accepted him as a new cast member of the show after an audition. Belushi developed a series of characters on the show that reached great success, including Henry Kissinger and Ludwig van Beethoven.

Belushi appeared in several films such as National Lampoon's Animal House, 1941, The Blues Brothers, and Neighbors. He also pursued interests in music; with Aykroyd, Lou Marini, Tom Malone, Steve Cropper, Donald "Duck" Dunn, and Paul Shaffer, he founded The Blues Brothers, which led to the film of the same name.

Belushi was dismissed from Saturday Night Live several times and rehired more than once. He died on March 5, 1982, at the age of 33. Cathy Smith confessed to dosing him with a lethal mixture of heroin and cocaine at the Chateau Marmont. Smith was charged with involuntary manslaughter, and was convicted and sentenced to 15 months in prison. Belushi was honored with a posthumous award of the star on the Hollywood Walk of Fame in 2004. He was the older brother of Jim Belushi.

== Early life and education ==
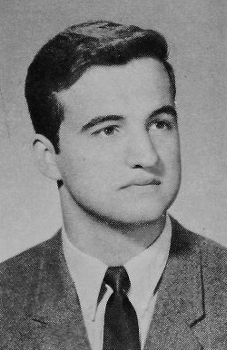
Belushi as a senior at Wheaton Central High School (1967)

John Adam Belushi was born to Agnes Demetri (née Samaras) Belushi and Adam Anastos Belushi in Humboldt Park, Chicago. Agnes was a pharmacy worker, who was born in Ohio to Albanian immigrants from Korçë, Albania. Adam Anastos Belushi was an Albanian immigrant from Qytezë, Albania, and was the owner of the Fair Oaks restaurant on North Avenue in Chicago.

Belushi was raised in Wheaton along with his three siblings—younger brothers Billy and Jim and sister Marian. He was Eastern Orthodox Christian, attending the Albanian Orthodox Church. He was educated at Wheaton Central High School, where he met his future wife, Judith Jacklin.

In 1965, Belushi formed a band, the Ravens, together with four fellow high-school students (Dick Blasucci, Michael Blasucci, Tony Pavilonis, and Phil Special). They recorded one single, "Listen to Me Now/Jolly Green Giant". Belushi played drums and sang vocals. The record was not successful, and the band broke up when he enrolled at the College of DuPage. During the summer of 1967, after graduating from high school, he was hired to perform in several plays at the Shawnee Summer Theatre of Greene County in Bloomfield, IN. He landed roles in Anna of a Thousand Days, Ten Little Indians, and The Tender Trap. He also attended the University of Wisconsin–Whitewater for a year, and during that time inspired the Animal House scene of a motorcycle driving up stairs. Belushi then attended The University of Illinois Chicago Circle (UICC) (now the University of Illinois Chicago) before joining the cast of Saturday Night Live. He acquired the iconic "College" crewneck, worn by his character in Animal House, at a print shop when visiting his brother Jim, who attended Southern Illinois University.

== Career ==
=== 1972–1975: Career beginnings: The Second City and National Lampoon ===
Belushi started his own comedy troupe in Chicago, the West Compass Trio (named after the improvisational cabaret revue Compass Players, active from 1955 to 1958 in Chicago), with Tino Insana and Steve Beshekas. Their success piqued the interest of Bernard Sahlins, the founder of The Second City, who asked Belushi to join the cast. At Second City, Belushi met and began working with Harold Ramis, Joe Flaherty, and Brian Doyle-Murray.

In 1972, Belushi was offered a role, together with Chevy Chase and Christopher Guest, in National Lampoon Lemmings, a parody of Woodstock, which played off-Broadway in 1972. Belushi and Jacklin moved to New York City. There, Belushi started working as a writer, director, and actor for The National Lampoon Radio Hour, a comedy radio show that was created, produced, and written by staff from National Lampoon magazine. Cast members on the shows produced by Belushi included Ramis, Flaherty, Guest, Brian Doyle Murray, his brother Bill Murray, Gilda Radner, and Richard Belzer. In 1974, Belushi and Chevy Chase voice-acted on a Lampoon Record. During a trip to Toronto in 1974, Belushi met Dan Aykroyd. Jacklin became an associate producer for the show, and she and Belushi were married on December 31, 1976. The National Lampoon Show toured the country in 1974; it was produced by Ivan Reitman. Lampoon owner Matty Simmons was offered a TV show on NBC at this time, but he declined the offer.

=== 1975–1978: Work at Saturday Night Live and breakthrough ===
In 1975, Chase and writer Michael O'Donoghue recommended Belushi to Lorne Michaels as a potential member for a TV show Michaels was about to produce for NBC called NBC's Saturday Night, later Saturday Night Live. Michaels was initially reluctant, unsure whether Belushi's physical humor would fit what he was envisioning, but he changed his mind after giving Belushi an audition. He appeared alongside O'Donoghue in SNL's first sketch (subsequently titled "the Wolverines") which aired on October 11, 1975.

Over his four-year tenure at SNL Belushi developed a series of successful characters, including the belligerent SNL Samurai; Henry Kissinger; Ludwig van Beethoven; the Greek owner (Pete Dionisopoulos) of the Olympia Café; Captain James T. Kirk; and a contributor of furious opinion pieces on Weekend Update, during which he coined a catchphrase, "But N-O-O-O-O-O-O-O-O-O!" With Aykroyd, Belushi created Jake and Elwood, the Blues Brothers. Originally intended to warm up the studio audience before broadcasts of SNL, the Blues Brothers were eventually featured as musical guests. Belushi also reprised his Lemmings imitation of Joe Cocker. Cocker himself joined Belushi in 1976 to sing "Feelin' Alright?" together.

Like many other SNL cast members and writers, but not all of them, Belushi was a recreational drug user. He attended concerts including Fleetwood Mac, Meat Loaf, Kiss, The Dead Boys, Warren Zevon, The Grateful Dead, and The Allman Brothers. In 1990, Michaels remembered him as a loyal trouper, to writers, a team player, yet he was fired and rehired at SNL.

In Rolling Stone's 2015 appraisal of all 141 SNL cast members, Belushi received the top ranking. "Belushi was the 'live' in Saturday Night Live", they wrote, "the one who made the show happen on the edge … Nobody embodied the highs and lows of Saturday Night Live like Belushi."

=== 1978–1982: Film debut, established actor and musician, and final years ===
In 1978, Belushi performed in the films Old Boyfriends (directed by Joan Tewkesbury), Goin' South (directed by Jack Nicholson), and National Lampoon's Animal House (directed by John Landis). Upon its initial release, Animal House received generally mixed reviews from critics, but Time magazine and Roger Ebert proclaimed it one of the year's best movies. Filmed at a cost of $2.8 million, it is one of the most profitable movies of all time, garnering an estimated gross of more than $141 million in the form of theatrical rentals and home video, not including merchandising. Animal House was written by Doug Kenney, Harold Ramis, and Chris Miller and followed in the tradition of the Marx Brothers films, featuring subversive, satirical plots that took on traditional institutions. Hollywood studios tried to replicate the film's success without its satire, resulting in a string of "nerds vs. jocks" films in the 1980s featuring cheap sight gags involving nudity and gross-out humor.

Following the success of the Blues Brothers on SNL, Belushi and Aykroyd, with the help of pianist-arranger Paul Shaffer, assembled studio talent forming a proper band. SNL saxophonist "Blue" Lou Marini and trombonist-saxophonist Tom Malone, who had previously played in Blood, Sweat & Tears, were there. At Shaffer's suggestion, guitarist Steve Cropper and bassist Donald "Duck" Dunn, the powerhouse combo from Booker T and the M.G.'s, who played on dozens of hits from Memphis's Stax Records during the 1960s, were signed as well. In 1978, the Blues Brothers released their debut album, Briefcase Full of Blues, with Atlantic Records. The album reached number 1 on the Billboard 200 and went double platinum. Two singles were released: "Rubber Biscuit", which reached number 37 on the Billboard Hot 100, and "Soul Man", which reached number 14.

In 1979, Belushi, along with Aykroyd, left SNL. They filmed the movie The Blues Brothers, which conflicted with the schedule of SNL. Michaels decided to leave in 1980 at the end of his contract. NBC's pressure to use recurring characters was also a factor in their decision. Belushi and Aykroyd made two movies together after leaving: Neighbors (directed by John Avildsen) and, most notably, The Blues Brothers (directed by John Landis). Released in the U.S. on June 20, 1980, The Blues Brothers received generally negative reviews. It earned just under $5 million in its opening weekend, and went on to gross $115.2 million in theaters worldwide before its release on home video. The Blues Brothers band toured to promote the film, which led to a third album (and second live album), Made in America, recorded at the Universal Amphitheatre in 1980. The track "Who's Making Love" peaked at number 39.

The only film Belushi made without Aykroyd following their departure from SNL was the romantic comedy Continental Divide (directed by Michael Apted). Released in September 1981, it starred Belushi as Chicago hometown hero writer Ernie Souchack (loosely based on newspaper columnist and long-time family friend Mike Royko), who gets an assignment researching a scientist (played by Blair Brown) who studies birds of prey in the remote Rocky Mountains.

By 1981, Belushi had become a fan and advocate of the punk rock band Fear after seeing them perform in several after-hours bars in NYC and brought them to Cherokee Studios to record songs for the soundtrack of Neighbors. Blues Brothers band member Tom Scott, along with producing partner and Cherokee owner Bruce Robb, initially helped with the session, but later pulled out due to conflicts with Belushi. The session was eventually produced by Cropper. The producers of Neighbors refused to use the song in the movie. As penance for the refusal, Belushi, along with O'Donoghue and SNL writer Nelson Lyon, booked Fear to play SNL's Halloween broadcast on October 31, 1981 (doing so by agreeing to make a cameo in the episode for free; indeed, he makes a silent cameo in the cold opening of the episode, in what was ultimately his last appearance on the show during his lifetime); the telecast of the performance featured then-novel moshing and stage diving, and was cut short by NBC due to the band's profanity. The New York Post published an account of these and other sensationalistic details of the event the following day.

Up to his death, Belushi was pursuing movie projects, including an ABSCAM-related caper called Moon Over Miami, to be directed by Louis Malle; and a diamond-smuggling caper called Noble Rot with Jay Sandrich, based on a script he adapted and rewrote with former SNL writer Don Novello. However, Paramount Studios offered to produce Noble Rot only if Belushi starred in The Joy of Sex, which would have featured him in a diaper. Aykroyd advised him to turn down The Joy of Sex and return to the East Coast, where Aykroyd was writing Ghostbusters. Belushi also talked about producing a film in a High Times tribute article from 1982: "Belushi wanted to give these daring captains courageous of consciousness the credit they deserved, he told me. He wanted to star in a major marijuana movie to be called Kingpin. He wanted to play the title role."

Belushi made a "guest-star appearance" on an episode of the TV series Police Squad! (1982). Each opening of the show featured a running gag in which the guest star died right away. Belushi died shortly before the episode was to air. The scene was cut and replaced by a segment with William Conrad.

== Drug use and death ==
Belushi had health issues in the early to mid 1970s, during his time with the National Lampoon group, due to his drug use. Cocaine was frequently used by some of the cast and some of the writers of Saturday Night Live, but Belushi's use quickly got out of control, and he was temporarily banned from the SNL set. Belushi was aware of warnings that he was headed for an early death, warnings that influenced the 1978 short film "Don't Look Back in Anger," included in the March 11, 1978 SNL episode. Directed by Tom Schiller, the film portrays Belushi ironically as the last surviving member of the cast. He remarks, "They all thought I’d be the first one to go. I was one of those ‘live fast, die young, leave a good-looking corpse’ types, you know?"

During the production of The Blues Brothers, director John Landis confronted Belushi in his trailer after finding a stash of cocaine. Belushi tearfully admitted his addiction during the argument. Belushi was also frequently late for his call times and would delay shooting by wandering off set. The production hired Smokey Wendell to prevent Belushi from accessing more drugs. He managed to quit his habit during the production of Continental Divide, but severely relapsed during the production of Neighbors.

A few months after the filming of Neighbors ended, on the evening of February 28, 1982, he checked in to a bungalow at the Chateau Marmont in L.A. Officially, he was in L.A. for conferences with his longtime manager Bernie Brillstein and movie studio executives about projects. For several days, he frequented various nightclubs on the Sunset Strip and Santa Monica Boulevard.

On March 4, 1982, Belushi visited the L.A. office of Bernie Brillstein and asked him for money. Brillstein declined, suspecting that Belushi wanted more drugs. Later that day, Belushi returned and again asked for money while Brillstein was in a meeting. Brillstein was reluctant to rebuke Belushi in front of the other person and gave him the money. In the early morning hours of March 5, 1982, Belushi, while in his Chateau Marmont bungalow, was visited separately by friends Robin Williams and Robert De Niro, as well as Cathy Smith.

Around noon on March 5, 1982, Belushi's fitness trainer, Bill Wallace, found Belushi dead at the Chateau Marmont bungalow. During a preliminary hearing held in September 1985, two pathologists testified that Belushi's cause of death was an overdose from cocaine and heroin.

Cathy Smith was arrested by the LAPD on March 5, 1982, for possession of narcotics. This arrest was not in relation to Belushi's death. Later in 1982, Rolling Stone magazine described the circumstances of her arrest: "On the afternoon of March 5th, Cathy Evelyn Smith had appeared driving the wrong way into the one-way exit of the Chateau Marmont Hotel on Sunset Strip behind the wheel of John Belushi's rented red Mercedes … At that moment, a hundred feet away, Belushi lay naked and dead on the floor of his $200-a-day bungalow. The police who had cordoned off the area were reflexively insisting it had been 'death from natural causes'." The LAPD released Smith after questioning.

In an interview with the National Enquirer in May 1982, Smith admitted that she had been with Belushi at the Chateau Marmont on the night of his death. After the appearance of the Enquirer article, Smith was extradited from Canada and charged with second-degree murder. The case was delayed for four years while her lawyers negotiated. Smith pleaded no contest on June 11, 1986, to involuntary manslaughter and three counts of furnishing and administering controlled substances to Belushi in the hours before he was found dead. She served fifteen months in prison at California Institution for Women in Chino.

=== Funeral and burial ===
Belushi's funeral was conducted by an Albanian Orthodox priest. It was held on Martha's Vineyard with James Taylor, Murray and Aykroyd in attendance, and he was interred at Abel's Hill Cemetery in Chilmark. Belushi's tombstone has a skull and crossbones with the inscription, "I may be gone, but Rock and Roll lives on."

After the success of The Blues Brothers, Belushi's fame further escalated after his death. Members of his family, along with Chilmark officials, gradually grew more concerned that his gravesite would become a tourist attraction like Jim Morrison's. Reports of excess noise, damaging grass and disturbing the peace of others buried there, along with fans paying bizarre tributes by littering his gravesite with liquor bottles, beer cans and other paraphernalia. His widow arranged to have him reinterred in an unmarked grave near the original site. The tombstone of Belushi's mother at Elmwood Cemetery (River Grove, Illinois), has Belushi's name inscribed on it and thus serves as a cenotaph.

Belushi was scheduled to present the Best Visual Effects Oscar at the 1982 Academy Awards with Dan Aykroyd. Aykroyd presented the award alone, and stated from the lectern: "My partner, he would have loved to have been here tonight to present this award, since he was somewhat of a visual effect himself."

== Tributes, legacy, and popular culture ==
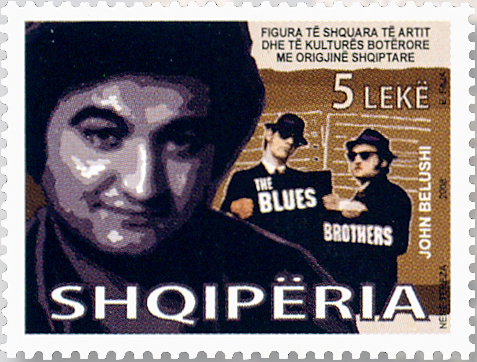
A 2008 stamp from Albania

During the first live SNL episode following Belushi's death, broadcast on March 20, 1982, cast member Brian Doyle-Murray gave a tribute to him. During the preproduction of Ghostbusters, Reitman remarked that Slimer bore a resemblance to Belushi's character Bluto from Animal House. Since then, Slimer has been described as "the ghost of John Belushi" by Aykroyd in many interviews.

Belushi's life was detailed in three books: the 1984 biography Wired: The Short Life and Fast Times of John Belushi by Bob Woodward, the accuracy of which has been questioned by journalists and by people close to Belushi, and the 1990 memoir Samurai Widow by his widow Judith. Woodward's book was adapted into a film of the same name in 1989, which was denounced by Aykroyd and Judith and received poor reviews from critics.

Six years after Belushi’s death, Elizabeth Taylor came out with a book that discussed her long struggle with low self-esteem and overeating. She referenced his comedic impersonation of her on SNL in 1978, when she had been overweight. She wrote, “How sad that that man went to such great lengths to satirize my excesses and then died of his own".

Belushi's career and death were prominently featured in the 1999 memoir of his manager Bernie Brillstein, who wrote that he was haunted by the comedian's death. He wrote that he learned how to better deal with clients. In 2005, Tanner Colby produced Belushi: A Biography, a collection of first-person interviews and photographs of Belushi's life, written in collaboration with Judith Belushi, his widow.

Eddie Money wrote "Passing by the Graveyard (Song for John B.)", from his 1982 album No Control, in tribute to Belushi. The two had become friends after Money was a musical guest on Saturday Night Live during the show's third season. The thrash metal group Anthrax penned a song about Belushi on their 1987 album Among the Living, titled "Efilnikufesin (N.F.L.)". Polish rock band Lady Pank recorded a song "John Belushi" for their 1988 album Tacy sami, with references to his Albanian ancestry. In 2025, Angus Stone, also known as Dope Lemon, released a song called "John Belushi" in his honor.

Belushi was portrayed in biographical films by actors Tyler Labine, Michael Chiklis and John Gemberling. Chris Farley, who was heavily influenced by Belushi, died in 1997 at age 33 due to a drug overdose, which has fueled many comparisons between Belushi and Farley.

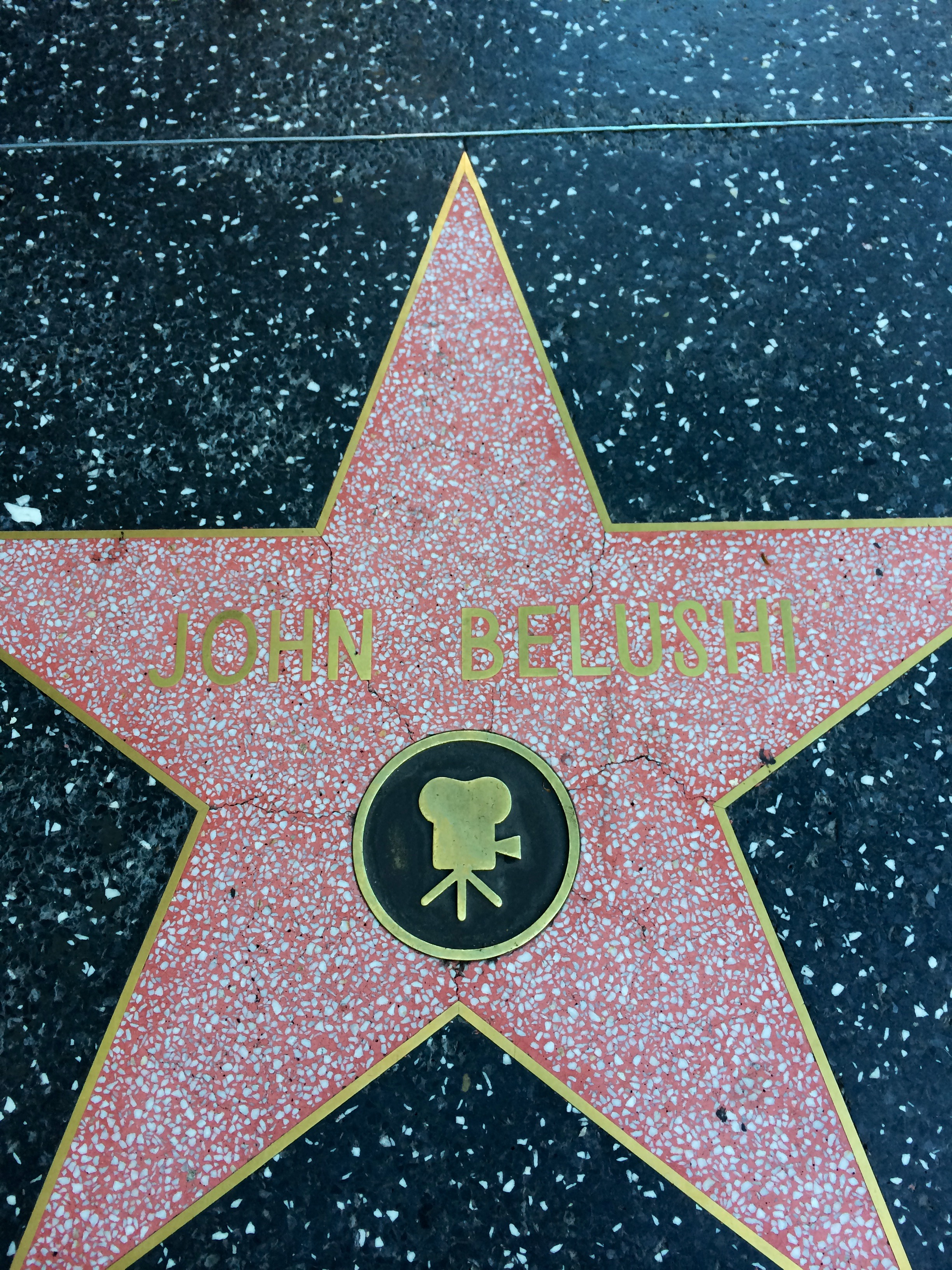
Belushi's star on the Hollywood Walk of Fame

In 2004, Belushi was posthumously inducted into the Hollywood Walk of Fame with a motion pictures star located at 6355 Hollywood Boulevard. In 2006, Biography Channel aired an episode of Final 24, a documentary following Belushi during the last 24 hours leading to his death. Four years later, Biography aired a full documentary of Belushi's life. In 2015, Belushi was ranked by Rolling Stone as the greatest Saturday Night Live cast member of all time.

Belushi's widow later remarried and became Judith Jacklin Belushi Pisano. However, she and her second husband, Victor Pisano, divorced in 2010.

Saturday Night Live castmate Jane Curtin claimed on The Oprah Winfrey Show in 2011 that Belushi was a misogynist who would deliberately sabotage the work of female writers and comics working on the show: "So you'd go to a table read, and if a woman writer had written a piece for John, he would not read it in his full voice. He felt as though it was his duty to sabotage pieces written by women." Judith maintained in 2020 that Belushi was a "Women's Libber" and did not hate women.

Judith, who worked to keep Belushi's legacy alive and was credited with helping Belushi and Dan Aykroyd with The Blues Brothers, died in July 2024.

Saturday Night Live writer Anne Beatts suggested in 2021 that because she was writing a book with his wife at the time, Belushi was frustrated with them spending more time on the book than with him. He complained to Michaels about Beatts and Rosie Shuster.

== Filmography ==
=== Film ===
Year	Title	Role	Notes
1975	Tarzoon: Shame of the Jungle	Craig Baker	English version; Voice role
1978	Animal House	John Blutarsky	
1978	Goin' South	Deputy Hector	
1979	Old Boyfriends	Eric Katz	
1979	1941	Captain Bill "Wild Bill" Kelso	
1980	The Blues Brothers	Jake "Joliet Jake" Blues	
1981	Continental Divide	Ernie Souchak	
1981	Neighbors	Earl Keese	Final film role

=== Television ===
Year	Title	Role	Notes
1975–1980	Saturday Night Live	Various Roles	79 episodes; also writer
1976	The Beach Boys: It's OK!	Cop #2	TV movie; also writer
1978	The Rutles: All You Need Is Cash	Ron Decline	TV movie

=== Others ===
Year	Title	Notes
1973	National Lampoon Lemmings	Stage
1973–1974	The National Lampoon Radio Hour	Radio; also Creative Director
1975	The National Lampoon Show	Stage

== Discography ==
- Listen to Me Now/Jolly Green Giant (Alonas Dream Records, 1965) (with the Ravens)
- National Lampoon's Lemmings (Blue Thumb Records, 1973) (bass guitar, lead vocals on Lonely At The Bottom)
- Old Boyfriends: Original Soundtrack (Columbia, 1978) (lead vocals on Jailhouse Rock, You Belong to Me, Get Up and Down and Tush)
- National Lampoon's Animal House: Original Soundtrack (Universal, 1978) (lead vocals on Money (That's What I Want) and Louie Louie)
- Briefcase Full of Blues (Atlantic, 1978) US #1 (with the Blues Brothers)
- The Blues Brothers: Music from the Soundtrack (Atlantic, 1980) US #13 (with the Blues Brothers)
- Made in America (Atlantic, 1980) US #49 (with the Blues Brothers)
- Best of The Blues Brothers (Atlantic, 1981) US #143 (with the Blues Brothers)
- Dancin' wid da Blues Brothers (Atlantic, 1983) (with the Blues Brothers)
- Everybody Needs the Blues Brothers (Atlantic, 1988) (with the Blues Brothers)
- The Definitive Collection (Atlantic, 1992) (with the Blues Brothers)
- The Very Best of The Blues Brothers (Atlantic, 1995) (with the Blues Brothers)
- The Blues Brothers Complete (Atlantic, 2000) (with the Blues Brothers)
- The Essentials (Atlantic, 2003) (with the Blues Brothers)
- Neighbors (Fear Records, 2015) (with Fear)

=== Comedy albums ===
- Official National Lampoon Stereo Test and Demonstration Record (National Lampoon, 1974)
- The Missing White House Tapes (National Lampoon, 1974)
- National Lampoon Gold Turkey (National Lampoon, 1975)
- NBC's Saturday Night Live (Arista, 1976)
- National Lampoon That's Not Funny, That's Sick (National Lampoon, 1977)
- Greatest Hits of the National Lampoon (National Lampoon, 1978)
- National Lampoon White Album (National Lampoon, 1979)

== See also ==
- The Last Voyage of the Starship Enterprise
- Olympia Café
- List of deaths from drug overdose and intoxication
- Belushi, a 2020 documentary film about him
