= Judith Belushi-Pisano =

American radio and television producer (1951–2024)

- Born: Judith Victoria Jacklin; January 7, 1951; Oak Park, Illinois, U.S.
- Died: July 5, 2024 (aged 73); Martha's Vineyard, Massachusetts, U.S.
- Other name: Judy Jacklin Belushi
- Occupations: Radio and television producer
- Spouses: John Belushi (m. 1976; died 1982); Victor Pisano (m. 1990; div. 2010)
- Children: 1
- Relatives: Jim Belushi (brother-in-law)

Judith Victoria Belushi-Pisano (born Judith Victoria Jacklin; January 7, 1951 – July 5, 2024), also known as Judy Jacklin Belushi, was an American radio and television producer.

== Life and career ==
Belushi-Pisano was born in Oak Park, Illinois, the daughter of Les Jacklin and Jean Buchanan. She grew up in Wheaton, Illinois, where she met John Belushi during high school. They moved to New York City as his career took off, and married in 1976. She was a radio producer for The National Lampoon Radio Hour.

Belushi's drug use put a strain on their marriage, and he died from a drug overdose in 1982. In the aftermath of her husband's death, Belushi-Pisano challenged the popular image that formed of him as "a hard-partying drug addict", as described by The New York Times, in favor of a more nuanced portrait that put his addiction in the context of "sudden fame, abysmal self-doubt and a [drug-heavy] celebrity culture". In 1990, she married producer, writer, and director Victor Pisano; he had three daughters from a previous marriage and they had one son before divorcing in 2010.

In 2011, Belushi-Pisano was nominated for a Primetime Emmy Award in the category Outstanding Nonfiction Series for her work on the television program Biography. Her nomination was shared with Peter Tarshis, Thomas Moody, Kevin Bachar, Amelia Hanibelsz, Joey Allen and Rob Goldberg.

== Death ==
Belushi-Pisano died from endometrial cancer at her home on Martha's Vineyard, on July 5, 2024, at the age of 73.
