= Lennon Remembers =

Book by Jann Wenner

- Author: Jann Wenner
- Subject: John Lennon, the Beatles
- Genre: Interview
- Publisher: Straight Arrow
- Publication date: November 1971
- Media type: Book
- Pages: 160 (approx.)

Lennon Remembers is a 1971 book by Rolling Stone magazine's co-founder and editor Jann Wenner. It consists of a lengthy interview that Wenner carried out with the former Beatle John Lennon in December 1970 and which was originally serialised in Rolling Stone in its issues dated 21 January and 4 February 1971. The interview was intended to promote Lennon's primal therapy-inspired album John Lennon/Plastic Ono Band and reflects the singer's emotions and mindset after undergoing an intense course of the therapy under Arthur Janov. It also serves as a rebuttal to Paul McCartney's public announcement of the Beatles' break-up, in April 1970.

Accompanied by his wife, Yoko Ono, Lennon aired his grievances to Wenner about the Beatles' career and the compromises the band made during their years of international fame. He makes cutting remarks about his former bandmates, particularly McCartney, as well as associates and friends such as George Martin, Mick Jagger and Derek Taylor, and about the group's business adversaries. Lennon portrays himself as a genius who has suffered for his art. He also states his disillusion with the philosophies and beliefs that guided the Beatles and their audience during the 1960s, and commits to a more politically radical agenda for the new decade.

Although Wenner's decision to re-publish the interview was done without Lennon's consent, the book helped create an enduring image of Lennon as the working-class artist dedicated to truth and lack of artifice. While some commentators question its reliability, the interview became a highly influential piece of rock journalism. It also helped establish Rolling Stone as a commercially successful magazine.

== Background ==
Rolling Stone had included a picture of John Lennon on the cover of its inaugural issue, dated 9 November 1967, and did so again a year later, when the magazine featured a photo of him and Yoko Ono naked, in support of the couple's controversial avant-garde album, Two Virgins. Jann Wenner, the magazine's editor, also supported Lennon when other counterculture publications were critical of his and the Beatles' pacifist stance in reaction to the politically turbulent events of 1968. In May 1970, a month after Paul McCartney had announced the Beatles' break-up, Rolling Stone published Lennon's response, in which he depicted McCartney as taking credit for the situation when in fact he, George Harrison and Ringo Starr had each left the band on occasion. At this time, with Lennon and Ono in California to continue their primal therapy treatment under Arthur Janov, Wenner had wanted to carry out an in-depth interview with Lennon for Rolling Stone. Instead, Lennon and Ono undertook four months of therapy with Janov and then returned to London to record their respective albums John Lennon/Plastic Ono Band – Lennon's first collection of songs outside the Beatles – and Yoko Ono/Plastic Ono Band.

Wenner was finally able to interview Lennon in late 1970, when he and Ono were in New York City visiting friends and filming Up Your Legs Forever and Fly with avant-garde film-maker Jonas Mekas. The interview took place on 8 December in the boardroom of Allen Klein's company ABKCO, at 1500 Broadway, and was intended to promote John Lennon/Plastic Ono Band. Lennon was accompanied by Ono, and Wenner taped the proceedings.

Lennon had arranged to meet with McCartney while they were both in New York, in order to discuss their differences regarding the Beatles' company Apple Corps, but McCartney cancelled the meeting. Lennon said that he was planning on not showing up anyway. Since making his announcement in April, McCartney had told London's Evening Standard newspaper that he wanted to leave the Beatles' record label, Apple Records, and reiterated his opposition to Klein's appointment as the band's business manager. With no further explanation on the break-up, media speculation had instead focused on the possibility of the band members solving their differences and reuniting.

== Interview content ==
Lennon discussed the Beatles' history, giving details that were little known beforehand. Among these was the first public confirmation of Brian Epstein's homosexuality. According to author Peter Doggett, the interview represents a piece of concept art that matches the raw emotional content of Lennon's Plastic Ono Band album. As with Lennon's new music, it reflected the principles of primal therapy in its engagement with, and rejection of, the past and associated emotional pain.

=== Inauthenticity of the Beatles ===
Lennon begins by saying that Plastic Ono Band is "the best thing I've ever done". He states his satisfaction with tracks such as "Mother", for its sparse sound and unadorned arrangement; "Working Class Hero", as "a song for the revolution"; and "God", in which he disavows his former beliefs and "myths", including the Beatles, before announcing that "The dream is over". He tells Wenner: "I'm not just talking about the Beatles, I'm talking about the generation thing. It's over, and we gotta – I have to personally – get down to so-called reality."

By comparison, Lennon denigrates most of the Beatles' work as dishonest. He highlights his compositions "Help!", "In My Life", "Strawberry Fields Forever" and "Across the Universe" as examples of the "truth" he brought to the band's music. He says that, with Ono's influence, his songs on the White Album represent a sustained study in first-person narrative and therefore authenticity in his art. When asked about his former bandmates' recent solo releases, he describes McCartney's self-titled album as "rubbish" and says that Plastic Ono Band will most likely "scare him into doing something decent". Lennon says he prefers Harrison's All Things Must Pass to McCartney, but qualifies the comment by saying: "Personally, at home, I wouldn't play that kind of music ... I don't want to hurt George's feelings, I don't know what to say about it." He similarly describes Starr's Beaucoups of Blues as "good" but says: "I wouldn't buy it, you know ... I didn't feel as embarrassed as I did about his first record [Sentimental Journey]."

He identifies himself as a "genius" whose talents were overlooked or ignored since childhood, by school teachers and by his aunt, Mimi Smith, who brought him up following the death of his mother. According to Lennon, this genius was similarly belittled or compromised by the expectations of fans and music critics, who favoured the conformist, "Engelbert Humperdinck" side of the Beatles, as represented by McCartney. When discussing the Lennon–McCartney songwriting partnership, Lennon identifies himself as the artist and truth-teller, and McCartney as a commercially focused tunesmith. He complains that, as an artist, having to play the part of a Beatle was "torture", adding: "I resent performing for fucking idiots who don't know anything. They can't feel ... They live vicariously through me and other artists ..." He denigrates the band's US fans at the height of Beatlemania, saying that American youth in 1964 displayed a clean-cut, wholesome appearance yet represented an "ugly race". Regarding rock critics, he states: "What do I have to do to prove to you son-of-a-bitches what I can do, and who I am? Don't dare, don't you dare fuckin' dare criticize my work like that. You, who don't know anything about it. Fuckin' bullshit!"

Lennon says that the Beatles' image was sanitised by their agreeing to Epstein's requirement that they wear suits and curb the riotous behaviour that had been a feature of the group's stage shows in Hamburg in the early 1960s. He says that with their international fame, the band's existence became a constant humiliation in which they were denied the freedom to speak out about global issues and their artistic integrity was lost. He dismisses the 1968 book The Beatles – the band's authorised biography written by Hunter Davies – as a further example of their image being whitewashed for the public. (Note: Lennon instead recommends "Love Me Do": The Beatles' Progress, a 1964 book by journalist Michael Braun. He describes it as a "true" depiction, since "[Braun] wrote how we were, which was bastards – you can't be anything else in a position of such pressure.") Lennon says that he himself allowed his Aunt Mimi to remove the "truth bits" about his childhood in Liverpool, but that Davies omitted any mention of drug-taking or the "orgies" taking place during the Beatles' concert tours. Lennon likens these backstage and hotel parties to the debauchery depicted in Frederico Fellini's film Satyricon. He blames the Beatles' audience for idolising the false image and reinforcing the myth surrounding the band. (Note: Author and critic Tim Riley likens the Rolling Stone interview to a patient's outpouring to their psychiatrist. He comments on Lennon's outrage: "He goes to such pains to denigrate his audience, and the many petty humiliations of celebrity, that half the time it's not clear who Lennon thought he was talking to – Wenner, Janov, his readers, the Beatles or rock history itself.")

=== LSD, Maharishi and primal therapy ===
Lennon discusses his consumption of hallucinogenic drugs such as LSD, saying that he and Harrison were the most adventurous with the drug, and claiming that he himself had taken "a thousand trips". He agrees with Ono that LSD and his subsequent absorption in meditation under Maharishi Mahesh Yogi were "mirrors" to his own identity. Lennon recounts his and Harrison's final meeting with the Maharishi before the pair left his ashram in India. Lennon says that Janov's primal therapy is another "mirror", but it has freed him from his natural introspection.

=== McCartney and Beatles associates ===
Amid his complaints about the Beatles, Lennon especially targets McCartney. He says that after Epstein's death in 1967, McCartney assumed a leadership role, but it took the band "in circles". He characterises McCartney as controlling and self-interested, saying that McCartney treated him and Harrison as sidemen. Lennon identifies Let It Be as a project "by Paul for Paul", in which scenes featuring Lennon and Ono were excised to show McCartney as a more powerful force. Lennon heavily criticises his bandmates for their coldness towards Ono and their failure to recognise her as a creative equal. He says that while Starr was more accepting, he could never forgive Harrison and McCartney for their dismissal of Ono. He attributes the couple's descent into heroin addiction to the disapproval they received from the Beatles and those close to the band.

Lennon dismisses producer George Martin's contribution to the Beatles' music, saying that Martin was merely a "translator". He pairs Martin with the Beatles' former music publisher, Dick James, as two associates who took credit for the band's success when in fact it was only the four Beatles who were responsible. Lennon says: "I'd like to hear Dick James' music and I'd like to hear George Martin's music, please, just play me some ... People are under a delusion that they made us, when in fact we made them." (Note: He also says that engineer Glyn Johns' work on the Let It Be sessions produced "the shittiest load of badly recorded shit", which was only salvaged for the 1970 album release by the talents of Phil Spector, Lennon's co-producer on Plastic Ono Band.) He then attacks the Beatles' long-serving aides Peter Brown, Derek Taylor and Neil Aspinall as having believed they too were part of the Beatles. According to Lennon, these individuals represented a false illusion among the staff at Apple, whereby the Beatles provided a "portable Rome" in which Brown, Taylor and Aspinall felt entitled to a position beside "the Caesars".

Lennon portrays Klein as the saviour of the Beatles' finances against entrepreneurs such as Lew Grade and Dick James. He says that Klein brought a working-class honesty to their business dealings and that this contrasted with the snobbishness of Lee Eastman, who was McCartney's choice over Klein. In Lennon's description, by siding with Eastman, McCartney had adopted a business stance that said: "I'm going to drag my feet and try and fuck you." Lennon also says that he left the Beatles in September 1969 but acquiesced to McCartney and Klein's urging that his departure be kept private, for business reasons, yet McCartney then turned his own departure into a public "event" in order to promote his first solo album.

=== Rock music, art and politics ===
He identifies 1950s rock 'n' roll and his latest work as the only valid form of rock music. He criticises the Rolling Stones for slavishly copying the Beatles, and questions the Stones' reputation as a more political and "revolutionary" group than the Beatles. Lennon attacks Mick Jagger personally, saying that, as the Stones' singer and frontman, he "resurrected 'bullshit movement,' wiggling your arse" and "fag dancing". He says that Bob Dylan's adoption of a pseudonym was a "bullshit" affectation, and dismisses Dylan's recently released New Morning as an album that "doesn't mean a fucking thing". (Note: Lennon also describes the band Blood Sweat & Tears as "bullshit" and typical of contemporary rock's move towards pretence and music excellence over emotional and artistic honesty.) By comparison, he views Ono's work as more interesting than Dylan and McCartney combined. He expresses his gratitude to Ono for introducing him to the conceptual art of Marcel Duchamp. Lennon states his allegiance to New Left politics and support for the avant-garde.

== Publication ==
=== Serialisation in Rolling Stone ===
Rolling Stone published the interview in two parts, in its issues dated 21 January 1971 and 4 February 1971. Wenner allowed Lennon to edit the transcripts before publication. At 30,000 words, the interview was considerably longer than the standard feature on a rock or pop artist. Both issues of the magazine featured Lennon on the cover, with photos taken by Annie Leibovitz. The first part was subtitled "The Working Class Hero" and the second, "Life with the Lions", which was the title of Lennon and Ono's 1969 experimental album. For Beatles fans, the content of the interview furthered the distasteful atmosphere surrounding the group's demise. Its publication followed the announcement, on 31 December 1970, that McCartney had launched an action against Lennon, Harrison and Starr in the London High Court of Justice, in an effort to extricate himself from Klein and all contractual obligations to Apple.

The two issues sold out immediately. The interview elevated Rolling Stone to its most prominent position yet in the US and established the magazine as an international title. Time magazine dubbed the combination of McCartney's lawsuit and Lennon's interview "Beatledämmerung", in reference to Wagner's opera about a war among the gods.

=== Book format ===
In April 1971, Wenner travelled to the UK to discuss with Lennon the possibility of publishing the interview in book form. Lennon was away in Spain but later left a message for Wenner saying that the interview was not to be re-published and that Wenner was "jumpin' da gun" by discussing the idea with a book publisher. Wenner nevertheless pursued the opportunity and received $40,000 for his book deal. Ono later said that Wenner had placed money before friendship; Wenner agreed, and described it as "one of the biggest mistakes I made". Lennon was incensed and never spoke to Wenner again.

Titled Lennon Remembers, the book was published by Straight Arrow in the autumn of 1971. By this time, Lennon had rejected Janov and, with Ono, had adopted a new philosophy, focused on political radicalism with New Left figures such as Jerry Rubin. In response to Wenner's invitation that they meet and discuss the book's publication, Lennon wrote him a letter, in late November, in which he said that he had only agreed to give Wenner the interview to help turn around the business difficulties that Rolling Stone was facing in 1970, and that Wenner had acted illegally. (Note: Lennon said that this was the second time he had stepped in to help the magazine, "Two Virgins was [the] first.") Lennon challenged Wenner to print the letter in Rolling Stone, "then we'll talk." Lennon took to calling the book "Lennon Regrets". In retaliation at Wenner, Apple temporarily withdrew its advertising from Rolling Stone. In early 1972, Lennon and Ono began contributing to a new San Francisco-based political and cultural magazine, SunDance, in an attempt to sabotage Wenner's commercial standing. (Note: Before recording the track for their 1972 album Some Time in New York City, Lennon and Ono made a demo of "The Luck of the Irish" that closes with the couple insulting Rolling Stone.)

Lennon Remembers was re-released in 2000 by Verso Books. For this edition, it contained the full two-part interview along with text that had been omitted from the initial publication. In his introduction, Wenner writes that the 1970 Lennon interview represented "the first time that any of the Beatles, let alone the man who had founded the group and was their leader, finally stepped outside of that protected, beloved fairy tale and told the truth ... He was bursting and bitter about the sugarcoated mythology of the Beatles and Paul McCartney's characterization of the breakup." (Note: According to music journalist Chris Ingham, the Verso edition includes an "insightful" foreword by Ono, who writes that Lennon's comments were "not tactful, not calculated, and for once not even particularly clever ... get a whiff of his energy!")

=== Audio ===
In the years following publication in 1971, segments of the recorded interview were broadcast on radio in the US. The most extensive airing was on The Lost Lennon Tapes, a series presented by Elliot Mintz and broadcast on Westwood One between January 1988 and March 1992. Some of Lennon's complaints about the Beatles' business acquaintances were edited out for the program.

In the UK, the interview was broadcast in full for the first time in December 2005. The following year, Rolling Stone made the audio available as a podcast on its website.

== Personal reactions and criticism ==
Lennon's comments were applauded by members of the New Left and ensured that he and Ono became figureheads for the cause. By contrast, William F. Buckley Jr., an arch-conservative journalist, wrote a highly critical editorial about the interview in his magazine National Review. Buckley criticised Lennon for revelling in egotism, and for his derision of those who had failed to venerate him in the past. Buckley also wrote: "It is remarkable to achieve in combination what Mr. Lennon manages to do here, namely a) to demonstrate how he laid waste his life during the 1960s, and b) to proclaim so apodictically on how others should govern their lives: (recipe: adore Lennon, and (favourite verb ['fuck']) your neighbor)." Writing in the lay Catholic Commonweal in September 1972, Todd Gitlin welcomed Lennon's forthrightness. He said that, in debunking the Beatles and 1960s counterculture, Lennon "revives the idea of leader as exemplar" and had provided a new direction for "the movement".

I was very incensed about that interview. I think everybody was. I think he slagged off everybody, including the Queen of England. I don't think anyone escaped his attention.

— Beatles producer George Martin

Hunter Davies said that shortly after reading the Rolling Stone interview, he phoned Lennon to complain about his disparagement of the 1968 Beatles biography. According to Davies, Lennon offered an apology and said: "You know me, Hunt. I just say anything." In an interview with Doggett, Derek Taylor refuted Lennon's assertion of him and Aspinall, saying that they had both always respected the boundaries between themselves and the Beatles, and were feeling disconsolate enough with the failure of Apple. Taylor added: "John later retracted some of it, and we became friends again ... He would forget he'd said [something], and expect to be forgiven, as he always was." George Martin was infuriated and recalled challenging Lennon on his comments in 1974: "He said, 'Oh Christ, I was stoned out of my fucking mind. You didn't take any notice of that, did you?' I said, 'Well, I did, and it hurt.'"

In his first Rolling Stone interview, in late 1973, McCartney admitted he had been devastated by Lennon's statements about him. He recalled: "I sat down and pored over every little paragraph, every sentence ... And at the time I thought. 'It's me ... That's just what I'm like. He's captured me so well; I'm a turd." (Note: In a 1987 Rolling Stone interview, McCartney said that he still went "over this ground in my mind" and that, at the time, Lennon's comments about him were "very hurtful".) McCartney responded by writing "Too Many People", in which, he told Playboy in 1984, he addressed Lennon's "preaching". After the song's release on McCartney's Ram album in May 1971, Lennon detected other examples of McCartney attacking him and responded with the song "How Do You Sleep?" The two former bandmates continued their public feud through the letters page of Melody Maker, with some of Lennon's correspondence requiring censorship by the magazine's editor.

Janov reflected in 2000 that, with Lennon and Ono having left his care in August 1970 due to intervention from US immigration authorities, "They cut the therapy off just as it started, really." Janov added: "We had opened him up, and we didn't have time to put him back together again." Harrison said that, until Lennon entered his primal therapy period, "we didn't really realize the extent to which John was screwed up." In a 1974 interview, Harrison criticised Wenner for publishing the book and for ignoring Lennon's claims that he no longer meant some of the things he had said.

Combined with the uncompromising message of Lennon and Ono's political direction over 1971–72, the 1970 interview became the subject of parody. Released in 1972, National Lampoon's Radio Dinner included the track "Magical Misery Tour" in which Tony Hendra parodied the primal therapy-inspired songwriting of Lennon. The lyrics of the song were taken entirely from Lennon Remembers and, as a closing refrain, highlighted Lennon's contention that "Genius is pain!" ending with a parody of Yoko's voice saying: "The Dream Is Over".

== Legacy ==
=== Influence on Beatles historiography ===
Lennon's 1970 Rolling Stone interview became a key document in Beatles literature and, until the mid-1990s, was often viewed as the definitive statement on the Beatles' break-up. In its espousal of countercultural and New Left ideology, the interview also helped foster among rock journalists a more favourable view of Lennon than of McCartney, whose work as a solo artist, in line with Lennon's description of their respective approaches, was frequently ridiculed for its lack of profundity. The publication in book form aided these developments, in addition to Wenner continuing to present it as an accurate record of events, despite Lennon having contradicted or retracted some of his assertions in the years after the interview. Writing in her book The Beatles and the Historians, historian Erin Torkelson Weber recognises this as typical of a Beatles historiographical approach whereby the band's biographers allowed fact to be determined by "which side spoke loudest and gave the most interviews".

Aware of his betrayal of Lennon's trust when he published Lennon Remembers, Wenner sought to make amends following the singer's fatal shooting in New York in December 1980. For the John Lennon commemorative issue of Rolling Stone, Wenner wrote an effusive feature article that lauded Lennon's achievements during and after the Beatles. (Note: Wenner biographer Joe Hagan describes it as an "iconic issue" which allowed Wenner to acknowledge that Rolling Stone had "made its reputation and business on the image of John Lennon, and on Lennon's fame".) Having renewed his friendship with Ono, Wenner also used the magazine to champion her work and to defend Lennon's legacy against author Albert Goldman's depiction in the controversial 1988 biography The Lives of John Lennon. McCartney believed that this commemorative issue, along with other posthumous tributes to Lennon, afforded his former bandmate a messiah-like status that served to diminish the importance of his own contribution to the Beatles. In his first major interview after Lennon's death, McCartney said, "if I could get John Lennon back I'd ask him to undo this legacy he's left me." Throughout the 1980s and 1990s, McCartney sought to correct what he saw as a Lennon-biased revisionism to the Beatles' history, culminating in the 1997 publication of his authorised biography, Paul McCartney: Many Years from Now, by Barry Miles. In Weber's view, Many Years from Now represents the "closest thing to a personal rebuttal of the Lennon Remembers interview" from any of Lennon's former bandmates.

=== Retrospective assessments ===
[The] mistake to make with this thrilling series of reminiscences is to take it at face value. This is Lennon at his most vulnerable, bitter and unforgiving. His blowtorch honesty is so persuasive it's easy to get swept up in it. However, anyone who hears the audio of his rant against his aunt for not recognising his genius is left with little doubt that this was a man on the edge.

— Music journalist Chris Ingham

In his 2007 article on Lennon's Rolling Stone interview, for The Guardian, Hunter Davies wrote that the interview was revelatory at the time, and it remained "fascinating" because "all these years later, the Beatles grow bigger, better, all the time." Davies acknowledged that it was "hardly a balanced account, even about himself" and that Lennon's disgust with the Beatles was mostly aimed inwards at his own compromises under Epstein's management, but the interview nevertheless presented Lennon in his element as a natural raconteur, with Wenner equally adept at bringing out Lennon's passion. In 2005, BBC Radio 4's John Lennon Season included a feature on the interview, using the original tapes and new commentary from Wenner and Ono. The BBC's writer described the 1970 interview as "seminal" and "the most famous interview" that Wenner had ever conducted for Rolling Stone, as well as "one of the most important ever done with a popular musician". Writing that same year in Uncut Legends: Lennon, Gavin Martin described it as "the most candid, electrifying, open and honest interview of his career, possibly in rock n roll history" in which Lennon "delivers the ultimate statement on Beatles excess, the scheming, corporate obscenity, the failure of the '60s revolution". Author and critic Tim Riley describes it as a "central part of rock lore" and "the venting every rock star would later claim for granted, even though nobody can hold forth like Lennon".

Writing in the London Review of Books in 2000, Jeremy Harding said that Lennon's 1970 interview and the Plastic Ono Band album combined to "round off the 1960s nicely – or nastily, come to that", with Lennon's rhetoric echoing the lyric from "God" that "The dream is over". He wrote that the "perplexing contradictions" manifested in the book "seem easier to grasp in retrospect ... rock and roll fundamentalism v. avant-gardism; therapy v. politics; and, above all for Lennon, John v. the Beatles and all they stood for". Harding added that this "self-engrossed, witty, malicious, foolish" Lennon of 1970 was also more appealing to a new generation of listeners than had been the case for the Beatles' contemporary fans.

== Sources ==
- Badman, Keith (2001). The Beatles Diary Volume 2: After the Break-Up 1970–2001. London: Omnibus Press. ISBN 978-0-7119-8307-6.
- Clayson, Alan (2003). George Harrison. London: Sanctuary. ISBN 1-86074-489-3.
- Doggett, Peter (2007). There's a Riot Going On: Revolutionaries, Rock Stars, and the Rise and Fall of '60s Counter-Culture. Edinburgh, UK: Canongate Books. ISBN 978-1-84195-940-5.
- Doggett, Peter (2011). You Never Give Me Your Money: The Beatles After the Breakup. New York, NY: It Books. ISBN 978-0-06-177418-8.
- Frontani, Michael R. (2007). The Beatles: Image and the Media. Jackson, MS: University Press of Mississippi. ISBN 978-1-57806-966-8.
- Frontani, Michael (2009). "The Solo Years". In Womack, Kenneth (ed.). The Cambridge Companion to the Beatles. Cambridge, UK: Cambridge University Press. ISBN 978-0-521-68976-2.
- Hagan, Joe (2017). Sticky Fingers: The Life and Times of Jann Wenner and Rolling Stone Magazine. New York, NY: Knopf. ISBN 978-0-345-81505-7.
- Hertsgaard, Mark (1996). A Day in the Life: The Music and Artistry of the Beatles. London: Pan Books. ISBN 0-330-33891-9.
- Ingham, Chris (2006). The Rough Guide to the Beatles (2nd edn). London: Rough Guides/Penguin. ISBN 978-1-84836-525-4.
- Madinger, Chip; Easter, Mark (2000). Eight Arms to Hold You: The Solo Beatles Compendium. Chesterfield, MO: 44.1 Productions. ISBN 0-615-11724-4.
- Miles, Barry (2001). The Beatles Diary Volume 1: The Beatles Years. London: Omnibus Press. ISBN 0-7119-8308-9.
- Norman, Philip (2008). John Lennon: The Life. New York, NY: Ecco. ISBN 978-0-06-075402-0.
- Riley, Tim (2011). Lennon: The Man, the Myth, the Music – The Definitive Life. London: Random House. ISBN 978-0-7535-4020-6.
- Rodriguez, Robert (2010). Fab Four FAQ 2.0: The Beatles' Solo Years, 1970–1980. Milwaukee, WI: Backbeat Books. ISBN 978-1-4165-9093-4.
- Schaffner, Nicholas (1978). The Beatles Forever. New York, NY: McGraw-Hill. ISBN 0-07-055087-5.
- Sounes, Howard (2010). Fab: An Intimate Life of Paul McCartney. London: HarperCollins. ISBN 978-0-00-723705-0.
- Spitz, Bob (2005). The Beatles: The Biography. New York, NY: Little, Brown and Company. ISBN 0-316-80352-9.
- Tillery, Gary (2010). The Cynical Idealist: A Spiritual Biography of John Lennon. Wheaton, IL: Quest Books. ISBN 978-0-8356-0875-6.
- Weber, Erin Torkelson (2016). The Beatles and the Historians: An Analysis of Writings About the Fab Four. Jefferson, NC: McFarland. ISBN 978-1-4766-6266-4.
- Wiener, Jon (1991). Come Together: John Lennon in His Time. Urbana, IL: University of Illinois Press. ISBN 978-0-252-06131-8.
