= 1964–65 United States network television schedule (late night) =

These are the late-night schedules for all three networks for the 1964–65 season. All times are Eastern and Pacific.

1964 marked the debut of Les Crane's late-night talk show on ABC, billed as "new and controversial". It was the first time since 1955 that any network other than NBC had offered non-news programming in the late-night time slot.

In February 1965, ABC canceled The Les Crane Show for its failure to compete successfully with Johnny Carson's Tonight Show on NBC, replacing it with a new show in the same 11:15 PM time slot called ABC's Nightlife. Saddled by even worse ratings, ABC then announced in June that Les Crane would be hosting Nightlife for four weeks. By then, The Merv Griffin Show, another late-night show with a similar format had been introduced by Westinghouse Broadcasting for syndication.

NET is not included, as member television stations had local flexibility over most of their schedules, and broadcast times for network shows may vary. ABC and CBS are not included on the weekend schedules because those networks did not offer late-night programs of any kind on the weekend.

Talk/Variety shows are highlighted in yellow, Local News & Programs are highlighted in white.

== Monday-Friday ==
-		11:00 PM	11:30 PM	12:00 AM	12:30 AM	1:00 AM	1:30 AM	2:00 AM	2:30 AM	3:00 AM	3:30 AM	4:00 AM	4:30 AM	5:00 AM	5:30 AM
ABC	Fall	Local	The Les Crane Show			Local programming or sign-off
ABC	Winter	Local	ABC's Nightlife			Local programming or sign-off
ABC	June	Local	ABC's Nightlife with Les Crane			Local programming or sign-off
CBS		Local programming or sign-off
NBC		11:15 PM: The Tonight Show Starring Johnny Carson				local programming or sign-off

== Saturday/Sunday ==
-		11:15 PM	11:30 PM	12:00 AM	12:30 AM	1:00 AM	1:30 AM	2:00 AM	2:30 AM	3:00 AM	3:30 AM	4:00 AM	4:30 AM	5:00 AM	5:30 AM
NBC	January	11:15 PM: The Saturday Tonight Show/The Sunday Tonight Show				local programming or sign-off

- Beginning in January, repeats of The Tonight Show were scheduled on late Saturday and Sunday nights as The Saturday Tonight Show or The Sunday Tonight Show.

== By network ==
=== ABC ===
New Series

- The Les Crane Show
- ABC's Nightlife *
- ABC's Nightlife with Les Crane *

Not returning from 1963-64

- The Jerry Lewis Show

=== NBC ===
Returning Series

- The Tonight Show Starring Johnny Carson

New Series

- The Saturday/Sunday Tonight Show *
