= Desiderata (Les Crane album) =

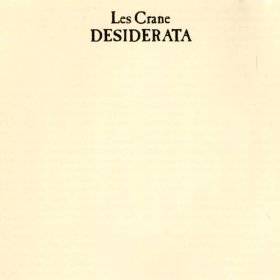

Studio album by Les Crane
- Released: 1971
- Genre: Spoken word
- Label: Warner Bros.
- Producer: Fred Werner

Professional ratings
Review scores
Source	Rating
AllMusic	4/5 stars

Desiderata is a 1971 album by Les Crane with music by Broadway composer Fred Werner and concept and various lyrics by David C. Wilson. It is a spoken-word album with sung refrains and instrumental accompaniment. The title and title track come from the widely circulated poem "Desiderata", which was widely perceived as ancient wisdom and not known to be a 1927 poem by Indiana lawyer Max Ehrmann.

Crane's supporting musicians included singer Evangeline Carmichael, whose daughter Carol Carmichael sang the "child of the universe" refrain on the title track, with musicians including keyboardist Michel Rubini, guitarist Louie Shelton, flautist Jim Horn and two percussionists, Joe Porcaro and Emil Richards. The album won the Grammy Award for Best Spoken Word Album.

The popularity of this recording was followed by a 1972 parody recording titled Deteriorata by National Lampoon, from the album Radio Dinner. Les Crane himself later admitted that he preferred the parody version over his Grammy-winning recording of the original poem.

== Music ==
The album includes well-known poetry such as Henry David Thoreau's "Different Drummer" (retitled "Independence" on the track list) and "Wilderness" (retitled "Nature") as well as original compositions such as "Friends."

The title track poem "Desiderata" had already been recorded by drummer Brian Davison's project band Every Which Way on the 1970 album Brian Davison's Every Which Way as "Go Placidly", with music by keyboardist and singer Graham Bell. "Go Placidly" was also released as a single. The music on Crane's album was performed by Broadway composer Fred Werner, whose music publisher Robert Bell of Crescendo Publishing identified the original source of the poem on the poster as Max Ehrmann. Werner's arrangement features repeated singing of the refrain "You are a child of the universe, No less than the trees and the stars: You have a right to be here."

Lindsay Planer, in her review of the album for AllMusic, wrote: "Crane's dulcet-toned reading became an anthem for those wishing to perpetuate the message of peace and love that had seemingly been abandoned in the wake of the '60s" and called the album "an inspired timepiece with an ageless message, rather than the one-hit wonder novelty that history will undoubtedly remember it as."

== Chart history (title track) ==
=== Weekly charts ===
Chart (1971–72)	Peak position
Australia	4
Canada RPM Adult Contemporary	2
Canada RPM Top Singles	4
Ireland (IRMA)	9
New Zealand (Listener)	1
South Africa (Springbok)	4
UK Melody Maker	6
U.S. Billboard Hot 100	8
U.S. Billboard Adult Contemporary	3
U.S. Cash Box Top 100	11

=== Year-end charts ===
Chart (1971)	Rank
Canada	56
U.S. (Joel Whitburn's Pop Annual)	76

== Track listing ==
1. "Prologue" – 0:18
2. "Desiderata" (Max Ehrmann, Fred Werner) – 4:18
3. "Vision" (Traditional, Werner) – 3:19
4. "Friends" (Wilson, Crane, Werner) – 4:42
5. "Beauty (Shining from the Inside Out)" (Wilson, Werner) – 3:03
6. "Happiness (I Got No Cares)" (Wilson, Werner) – 2:19
7. "Esperanza (Hope)" (Werner) – 2:33
8. "Nature (Wilderness)" (Rachel Thoreau, Werner) – 2:52
9. "Courage (Eyes That See)" (Wilson, Werner) – 4:26
10. "Independence (A Different Drummer)" (Thoreau, Ehrmann, Werner) – 2:29
11. "Love (Children Learn What They Live)" (Werner) – 3:43
12. "Epilogue" – 0:33
