= Fred Werner (American composer) =

American musician and composer (1934–2024)

- Born: Frederick Henry Werner Jr. 11 June 1934
- Died: June 11, 2024 (aged 90) Arizona, USA
- Genres: Film score; Musical theater
- Occupations: Musician; composer; arranger; musical director; orchestrator; conductor; musical supervisor
- Instruments: Piano
- Years active: Early 1960s – 2020s
- Website: www.fredwerner.com

Frederick Henry Werner Jr. (June 11, 1934 – June 11, 2024) was an American musician and composer who wrote and arranged music for television, cinema, and Broadway musicals. He started his career in New York in the early 1960s working with Frank Loesser, Noël Coward, and Bob Fosse. Later, he moved to California to work in television and movies, eventually returning to Broadway. He was nominated for a Tony Award in 1964 for Best Conductor and Musical Director for the musical High Spirits. He is also known for his work on Les Crane's 1971 album Desiderata.

== Theater works ==
Werner's first credited work was as the dance music arranger for The Conquering Hero in 1961, which ran on Broadway for eight performances. Later that same year, he worked as the vocal music arranger on Sail Away. He additionally served as the dance music arranger for Little Me in 1962 and 1964, and Sweet Charity on Broadway in 1966 and on the West End in 1967. Fred was the musical director for High Spirits in 1964 (earning him a Tony Award nomination), Pleasures and Palaces in 1965, and Sweet Charity both during its 1966 debut, and the 1986 revival. He is credited as the orchestrator on Skyscraper in 1965 and Sweet Charity in 1986, and the musical supervisor and arranger on Noël Coward's Sweet Potato in 1968. He arranged the music for Liza Minnelli's 1974 Broadway special Liza (see Live at the Winter Garden).

== Film and television work ==
Fred began his work in television and movies in 1967 as the music coordinator for the pilot episode of Rowan & Martin's Laugh-In. Continuing his work with Liza Minnelli and Bob Fosse in 1972, he was the choreographic music associate in the movie Cabaret, and the musical arranger and supervisor on the concert film Liza with a Z. In 1974, he worked as the music supervisor for the Lucille Ball musical film Mame and Huckleberry Finn. He is also credited as the composer and conductor for the Huckleberry Finn score. His final on-screen credit as the music supervisor was for the 1975 TV movie It's a Bird... It's a Plane... It's Superman!, for which he was also the conductor.

Fred composed theme and additional music for various projects, including the pilot of One Day at a Time (originally titled "Three to Get Ready"), The Dukes of Hazzard and The Dukes of Hazzard: Reunion!, and Flo. He was also the musical director for The Jim Nabors Hour for the entire run in 1978.

== Desiderata ==
Fred produced, composed, and performed music on the 1971 Les Crane album Desiderata. The title track poem "Desiderata" was originally written by the Indiana writer, poet, and attorney Max Ehrmann in 1927. Fred arranged the track to repeat "You are a child of the universe, No less than the trees and the stars: You have a right to be here." The album won the Grammy Award for Best Spoken Word Album in 1972.

== Personal life ==
Towards the end of his life, Fred was working on a new musical titled The Seven Year Itch. He died on June 11, 2024, his 90th birthday. He was subsequently honored at the 77th Tony Awards.

== Composition work ==
| Title | Year | Director | Notes |
|---|---|---|---|
| Hucklebery Finn | 1974 | J. Lee Thompson | Musical film |
| Harry O | 1975 | Richard Lang, Harry Falk | TV series |
| Moonshine County Express | 1977 | Gus Trikonis | Film |
| Eight is Enough | 1977 | David Moessinger, Reza Badiyi, William F. Claxton | TV series |
| The Fitzpatricks | 1977–1978 | Various | TV series |
| Beverly and Friends | 1978 | Mark Warren | TV movie |
| Legends of the Superheroes | 1979 | Bill Carruthers, Chris Darley | Television specials |
| America vs. the World: Circus Challenge | 1979 | Bill Carruthers | TV movie |
| Sweepstakes | 1979 | Various | TV series |
| The MacKenzies of Paradise Cove | 1979 | Jerry Thorpe, Harry Harris | TV series |
| Whodunnit? | 1979 | Bill Carruthers | TV game show |
| The Death of Ocean View Park | 1979 | E.W. Swackhamer | TV movie |
| Women Who Rate a 10 | 1981 | Mark Warren | TV special |
| Flo | 1980–1981 | Various | TV series |
| A Small Killing | 1981 | Steven Hilliard Stern | TV movie |
| Dynasty | 1981 | Gabrielle Beaumont, Jerome Courtland | TV series |
| Seven Brides for Seven Brothers | 1982 | Various | TV series |
| Dukes of Hazzard | 1979–1983 | Various | TV series |

== Studio albums ==
| Title | Year | Artist | Notes |
|---|---|---|---|
| The Grass Menagerie | 1968 | Henry Gibson | Composer |
| Desiderata | 1971 | Les Crane | Producer, arranger, audio production, conductor, composer |
| Emerge | 1973 | The McCrarys | Producer |
| You Light Up My Life | 1977 | Debby Boone | Arranger, producer |
| At Carnegie Hall | 1987 | Liza Minnelli | Arranger, orchestration |
| Highlights From the Carnegie Hall Concert | 1987 | Liza Minnelli | Orchestration, arranger, orchestra |
| Star-Spangled Rhythm | 1997 | Various | Arranger |
| The Music of DC Comics: 75th Anniversary Collection | 2010 | Various | Composer, primary artist |
