= Radio Dinner =

Studio album by National Lampoon
- Released: July 1972
- Genres: Comedy, parody
- Label: Blue Thumb
- Producers: Tony Hendra, Michael O'Donoghue, Bob Tischler

National Lampoon chronology
Radio Dinner (1972)	National Lampoon's Lemmings (1973)

Radio Dinner is the debut album by the creators of the American satirical magazine National Lampoon. It was released on Blue Thumb Records in 1972 after RCA Records had declined to issue the record. The humor on the album is steeped in the pop culture and politics of the era. It includes "Deteriorata", a parody of Les Crane's hit rendition of the poem "Desiderata", and commentary on the 1972 presidential race. Among several pieces satirizing the former Beatles, "Magical Misery Tour" is a parody of John Lennon's primal therapy-inspired songwriting and his 1970 Rolling Stone interview, later published in book form as Lennon Remembers.

The cover is the image of a TV dinner in the form of a radio.

Not to be confused with the Radio Dinner broadcast in 1924, and repeated annually from New York City.

== Sketches and songs ==
Radio Dinner parodies the pop culture and political landscape of the early 1970s. The record's principal creators were National Lampoon editors Tony Hendra and Michael O'Donoghue. Other writers for the magazine also contributed, and much of the material was derived from Christopher Guest's improvisatory style.

The record includes several references to and sketches about the solo careers of former Beatles John Lennon, George Harrison and Paul McCartney. It also satirizes Bob Dylan, played by Guest on "Those Fabulous Sixties", and Joan Baez, on "Pull the Tregros".

"Teenyrap", the title of several pieces of dialog spread throughout the album, features two teenagers discussing Harrison's 1971 Concert for Bangladesh aid project. The record ends with "Concert in Bangla Desh", where two Bangladeshi stand-up comedians (played by Guest and Hendra) perform to starving refugees, in an attempt to collect a bowlful of rice so that Harrison can stage a hunger strike. The comedians' jokes are punctuated by the sound of tabla rolls.

"Magical Misery Tour (Bootleg Record)" is a parody of Lennon's primal therapy-inspired songwriting style. The song's lyrics include the repeated cry of "Genius is pain!" and were taken directly from Lennon's 1970 Rolling Stone interview, later published in book form as Lennon Remembers. Hendra plays Lennon, while Melissa Manchester makes a brief speaking appearance as Yoko Ono. The album's liner notes states that the song is "From the album Yoko Is a Concept by Which We Measure Our Pain, recorded live at Rolling Stone. All Profits to go to the Toronto Peace Festival."

The album sends up McCartney's newfound politicization on his and Wings' 1972 single "Give Ireland Back to the Irish". Several times an Irish tenor begins to sing the song in a pub but is soon gunned down. There are also "clues" alluding to the "Paul is Dead" urban legend. These include four backmasked segments spread throughout the album. The LP's gatefold sleeve has the words "Clue Number Five: II Tim 4:6", as well as a picture frame that reads "CLUE NUMBER SIX" along the top, followed by "R.I.P.", and finally a partially covered "P. Mc."

The National Lampoon team parodies Les Crane's musical rendition of the poem "Desiderata" in "Deteriorata", and game shows in "Catch It and You Keep It". "Profiles in Chrome" includes Windy Craig as Richard Nixon, whose landslide win in the 1972 presidential election is also predicted.

== Release and reception ==
Professional ratings
Review scores
Source	Rating
AllMusic	4.5/5 stars
Newsday	A−
The Rolling Stone Record Guide	3/5 stars

Radio Dinner was originally set to be released on RCA Records, but the company balked at "David and Julie", a track focussing on the sex life of David and Julie Eisenhower—the son-in-law and daughter, respectively, of Richard Nixon. Hendra and O'Donoghue refused to cut the piece and took the album to Blue Thumb instead, but were met with the same objection. Lampoon relented and the album was released without "David and Julie".

According to Hendra in his 1987 book Going Too Far, Lennon was shocked by the depiction of him in "Magical Misery Tour" and walked out when a radio DJ played the track when Lennon and Ono were guests on his show.

In a 1973 review for Newsday, Robert Christgau wrote of Radio Dinner: "Except for one stupid bit about a car that runs for president, this is funny throughout, and often savage. As usual, the Lampoon crew raises bad taste to the level of masochism—what's remarkable is that they do even better on record what they have demonstrated they can do in print." Dave Marsh of Rolling Stone said that, like the magazine itself, National Lampoon's recording career began "brilliantly", and he described the parodies of Lennon, Dylan and Baez as "sheer genius".

The album became out of print in 1977 and, as of 2016, had yet to be reissued. In his overview of National Lampoon's recording output, for Vulture, Ramsay Ess describes "Magical Misery Tour" as arguably the album's "most famous track".

== Track listing ==
Side one

1. "Deteriorata" – 4:25
2. "Phono Phunnies/Teenyrap/It's Obvious" – 2:37
3. "Catch It and You Keep It/Pigeons/Teenyrap/Quinas 'n' 'Rasmus/All Kidding Aside (PSA)/Phono Phunnies/Teenyrap" – 10:05
4. "Magical Misery Tour (Bootleg Record)" – 4:08

Side two (titled "Side Thirteen")

1. "Those Fabulous Sixties" – 1:45
2. "Profiles in Chrome" – 8:16
3. "Teenyrap/Phono Phunnies/Pigeons/Support Your Locol Polece (PSA)" – 2:25
4. "Pull the Tregros/Teenyrap/Ng Asi/Phono Phunnies" – 6:25
5. "Concert in Bangla Desh" – 3:26

== Personnel ==
Adapted from the 1972 LP credits.

Performers

- Tony Hendra, Christopher Guest, Michael O'Donoghue, Diane Reed, Jack Marks, Melissa Manchester, Alex Bennett, Windy Craig, Loren Order, Jackson Beck, Jessica Hendra, Jill Andre, Naomi R. Page – vocals, dialogue
- Norman Rose – narration

Musicians

- Christopher Guest – guitar, musical arrangements
- Frani Bell – guitar
- Melissa Manchester – piano, keyboards
- John "Cooker" LoPresti, Dean Munson – bass
- Jim Payne – drums

== Charts ==
Chart (19672)	Peak position
US Billboard Top LPs & Tape	132
