= Deteriorata =

National Lampoon parody record (1972)

Single by National Lampoon

from the album Radio Dinner
- B-side: "Those Fabulous Sixties"
- Released: 1972
- Label: Banana Records
- Composer: Christopher Guest
- Producers: Michael O'Donoghue; Tony Hendra

Audio
- "Deteriorata" on YouTube

"Deteriorata" is a comedy record released as a single in 1972. It is a parody of Les Crane's 1971 spoken-word recording of "Desiderata", the early 20th-century poem by Max Ehrmann. ("Desiderata" is Latin for "desired things"; "deteriorata" is a portmanteau of the verb "deteriorate" and "desiderata".)

The parody was written by Tony Hendra for National Lampoon magazine, and was recorded for the National Lampoon album Radio Dinner. Narrator Norman Rose read the parody poem and Melissa Manchester was the lead vocalist, both closely tracking the format of Crane's original. Christopher Guest wrote the music.

"Deteriorata" appeared on the lower reaches of the Billboard magazine charts for a few weeks in late 1972, peaking as high as No. 91 on the Billboard Hot 100 Charts. The parody gained some significance and popularity as a frequent presentation on the Dr. Demento radio show.

Les Crane himself later admitted that he preferred the parody version over his Grammy-winning recording of the original poem.

== Cultural references ==
The song incorporates several catchphrases and news items of the era:

- "Consider that two wrongs never make a right, but that three do." A play on directional logic and the double meaning of the word "right.".
- "Remember the Pueblo", a bumper sticker slogan honoring the crew of the USS Pueblo, held hostage by North Korea in 1968.
- "Strive at all times to bend, fold, spindle and mutilate", parodies a caution printed on punched cards, particularly those used as government checks, during the mid-20th century.
- "Take heart amid the deepening gloom that your dog is finally getting enough cheese", making fun of a Gaines-Burgers dog food advertising campaign, which asked, "Is your dog getting enough cheese in his diet?"
- "Gracefully surrender the things of youth: birds, clean air, tuna, Taiwan": bird populations were affected by pesticides, the Environmental Protection Agency was established in 1970, tuna had been discovered to be high in mercury, and Taiwan was removed from the United Nations in favor of the heretofore unrecognized People's Republic of China in 1972.
