= The Joey Bishop Show (talk show) =

American late-night talk show

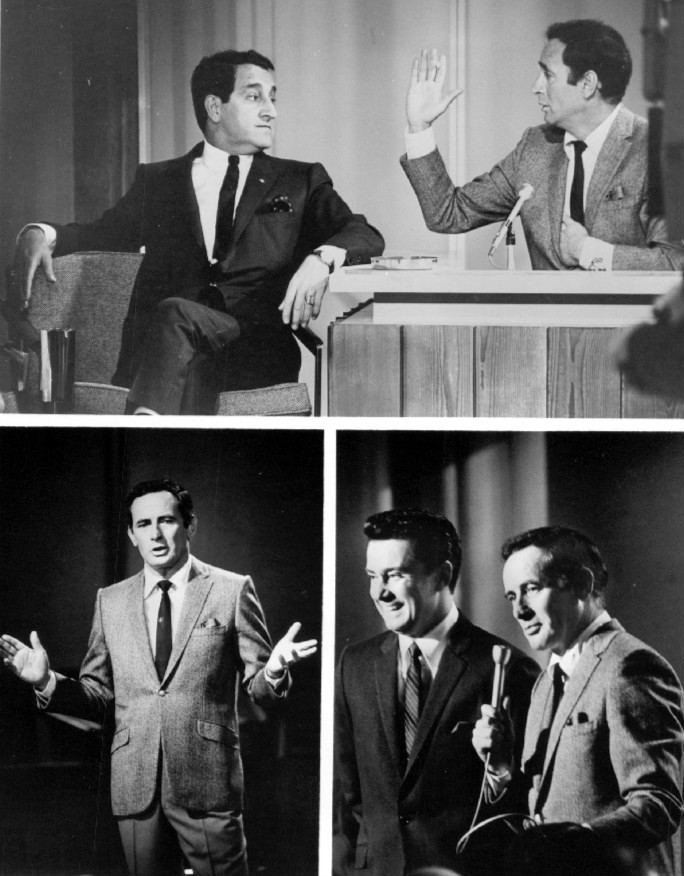
- Bishop with guest Danny Thomas and sidekick Regis Philbin, 1967
- Genre: Talk show
- Starring: Joey Bishop
- Announcer: Regis Philbin (sidekick)
- Music by: Johnny Mann and His Merry Men
- Country of origin: United States
- Original language: English
- No. of seasons: 2
- No. of episodes: 640

Production
- Producers: Ernest Chambers; Myles Harmon
- Production locations: Vine Street Theater, Los Angeles, California
- Running time: 90 minutes
- Production company: Joey Bishop Productions

Original release
- Network: ABC
- Release: April 17, 1967 – December 26, 1969

The Joey Bishop Show is an American late-night talk show hosted by Joey Bishop that aired on ABC from April 17, 1967, to December 26, 1969. The 90-minute program aired five nights a week and was developed by ABC as a competitor to NBC's The Tonight Show Starring Johnny Carson.

Regis Philbin served as Bishop's announcer and on-air sidekick. The program gave Philbin his first sustained national network television exposure and helped establish the host-sidekick partnership that became an important part of his later television persona.

Bishop had previously been a frequent guest host of Tonight and had starred in the unrelated sitcom The Joey Bishop Show from 1961 to 1965. His ABC talk show competed principally with Carson and, beginning in 1969, with CBS's The Merv Griffin Show. ABC canceled the program in December 1969, and The Dick Cavett Show replaced it in the late-night time slot.

== Background and development ==
Bishop had extensive experience in late-night television before receiving his own ABC program. He had been a frequent guest host of both Tonight Starring Jack Paar and The Tonight Show Starring Johnny Carson, appearing as a substitute host more than 150 times. He had also starred in the sitcom The Joey Bishop Show, which ran from 1961 to 1965.

ABC had previously tried to establish a late-night competitor to NBC's Tonight, including The Les Crane Show and Nightlife. In 1966, the network acquired the former Don Lee broadcasting complex at 1313 North Vine Street in Hollywood and renamed it the Vine Street Theater. The Joey Bishop Show originated from Studio 1 at the facility.

Regis Philbin, who had previously hosted television programs in San Diego and a nationally syndicated late-night program for Westinghouse Broadcasting, was selected as Bishop's announcer and on-air sidekick. Bishop and Philbin used a host-and-sidekick format similar to that of Carson and Ed McMahon, with Philbin frequently serving as the target of Bishop's jokes.

The program was produced as a 90-minute live-to-tape broadcast five nights a week. Its format combined Bishop's opening monologue, exchanges with Philbin, celebrity interviews, comedy and musical performances.

== Premiere ==
The Joey Bishop Show premiered on April 17, 1967. California governor Ronald Reagan was the first guest, followed by Danny Thomas, Debbie Reynolds, traffic court judge Noel Cannon and singer Brenda Arnau.

The debut coincided with the aftermath of the 1967 American Federation of Television and Radio Artists strike. Johnny Carson remained away from The Tonight Show for an additional week after the strike ended, leaving Bishop without direct competition from Carson during his first week on the air.

== Format and personnel ==
The 90-minute program followed the conventional late-night talk-show format, with an opening monologue by Bishop followed by interviews, comedy and musical performances. Regis Philbin served as announcer and Bishop's on-air sidekick, regularly participating in exchanges with Bishop between guests.

Johnny Mann was the program's musical director, with Johnny Mann and His Orchestra providing the show's music. The program also used guest hosts when Bishop was absent, including Frank Sinatra Jr., Chuck Connors, Art Linkletter and Jan Murray.

The show was created to challenge The Tonight Show Starring Johnny Carson, which Bishop frequently guest hosted in its early seasons. The program was shown five nights a week, Monday through Friday, with Carson as competition on NBC and, briefly, The Las Vegas Show hosted by Bill Dana on the short-lived U/United Network, and Merv Griffin also hosting a talk show on CBS, all in the same time slot, from 11:30 pm to 1:00 am. Jack Paar appeared on one of the early broadcasts as a kind of co-host as a favor to Bishop.

Bishop's fellow Rat Pack members Dean Martin, Sammy Davis Jr. and Peter Lawford appeared on the program, sometimes making unannounced appearances. Frank Sinatra was the only member of the group who did not appear.

== Regis Philbin walk-off ==
In July 1968, Regis Philbin announced during a live broadcast that he was leaving the program. Philbin said that he believed ABC executives were dissatisfied with his performance and that he feared he was hurting the show. He then walked off the set, leaving Bishop to continue without him.

Philbin returned to the program several days later. He later disclosed that the walk-off had been planned in advance with Bishop as a publicity stunt intended to attract attention to the program.

== Competition and cancelation ==
The Joey Bishop Show aired opposite NBC's The Tonight Show Starring Johnny Carson throughout its run. Bishop had difficulty matching Carson's ratings, and ABC's smaller number of late-night affiliate clearances also limited the program's potential audience.

Competition increased in August 1969 when CBS moved The Merv Griffin Show into the 11:30 p.m. time slot. By November, Bishop's program ranked third among the three network late-night talk shows. ABC president Elton H. Rule later said that the November ratings had fallen below a level the network considered sustainable.

ABC announced that the program would end in December 1969. Guest hosts were used more frequently during its final weeks, and the last broadcast aired on December 26.

== Final broadcasts ==
On November 26, 1969, Bishop left the program after his opening monologue, telling the audience that he was leaving the show. Philbin was left to complete the broadcast, and guest hosts presented the program during the remaining weeks of its run.

The series continued until December 26, 1969. Bishop returned for the final broadcast, delivered his opening monologue, thanked the audience and viewers, and announced that negotiations with ABC had failed. He then left the studio, leaving Philbin and scheduled guest Vic Damone to complete the remainder of the 90-minute program.

ABC replaced the program with The Dick Cavett Show, which took over the time slot on December 29, 1969. Bishop later returned to The Tonight Show as a guest host.

== Legacy ==
The Joey Bishop Show provided Regis Philbin with his first sustained exposure on national network television. Philbin later credited Bishop with helping establish his career and remained closely associated with him after the program ended.

The program was one of several attempts by ABC during the 1960s to establish a late-night competitor to NBC's The Tonight Show Starring Johnny Carson, following The Les Crane Show and Nightlife. ABC did not establish a durable competitor to Tonight in the time slot until the development of the news program Nightline, which became a ratings competitor to Carson during the 1980s.
