= Albert Goldman =

American academic and author (1927–1994)

- Born: Albert Harry Goldman; April 15, 1927; Dormont, Pennsylvania, U.S.
- Died: March 28, 1994 (aged 66); En route from Miami to London
- Education: University of Chicago
- Occupations: Author; academic

Albert Harry Goldman (April 15, 1927 – March 28, 1994) was an American academic and author.

Goldman wrote about the culture and personalities of the American music industry, both in books and as a contributor to magazines. He is known for his bestselling book on Lenny Bruce and his controversial biographies of Elvis Presley and John Lennon.

== Early life and education ==
Albert Goldman was born in Dormont, Pennsylvania, and raised in Mount Lebanon, Pennsylvania.

Goldman briefly studied theater at the Carnegie Institute of Technology before serving in the U.S. Navy from 1945 to 1946. He earned a master's degree in English from the University of Chicago in 1950; under the chancellery of Robert Maynard Hutchins, students who were not enrolled in the generalist "Chicago Plan" undergraduate degree program were designated as master's students and received the higher degree after five years of study.

Upon matriculating in the English doctoral program at Columbia University, Goldman began to teach literature courses at several institutions in New York City, including the City College of New York, Hunter College, Baruch College, Brooklyn College, the School of Visual Arts and the Columbia University School of General Studies. During this period, he first became acquainted with Lenny Bruce through his wife, Florence Singer, who introduced her husband to New York's jazz scene before going on to "re-raise [Goldman] as a hip Brooklyn Jew" along with her family and friends throughout his doctoral studies, effectively planting the seeds for his later interest in popular culture. Following studies under Lionel Trilling and Jacques Barzun, he completed his Ph.D. in 1961 with a dissertation on Thomas de Quincey. Goldman argued that de Quincey had plagiarized most of his acclaimed journalism from lesser-known writers; the dissertation was subsequently published as a monograph (The Mine and the Mint: Sources for the Writings of Thomas DeQuincey) by Southern Illinois University Press in 1965. He also co-edited Wagner on Music and Drama (1964), a compendium of Richard Wagner's theoretical writings.

After completing his doctorate degree, Goldman remained affiliated with Columbia, where he was an adjunct associate professor of English and comparative literature from 1963 to 1972; among his course offerings was the university's first class on popular culture. A close friend of Philip Roth, Goldman may have influenced the characterisation of libidinous academic David Kepesh, notably showcased by Roth in such works as The Breast (1972) and The Professor of Desire (1977).

== Career ==
=== Ladies and Gentlemen Lenny Bruce!! ===
A biography on Lenny Bruce showing where Bruce's humor came from. Writing for The New Yorker, critic of the time Pauline Kael mentions that Goldman's provides a "sense of how Bruce's act developed, and who the audiences were, what the clubs were like, and what the other comics were doing." Goldman revered Bruce and argues against the sanctification of him shedding light on Bruce as a "junkie and putting down those who stayed clear of drugs."

=== Elvis Presley biography ===
In Goldman's critical 1981 biography Elvis, he dismissed the performer as a plagiarist who never did anything of note after his first records at Sun Records, insisting that he was inferior as an artist to Little Richard and other contemporaries. He also portrayed Presley as mentally ill, using stories such as Presley taking his friends halfway across the country to buy them peanut-butter sandwiches as evidence that the singer had lost his grip on reality.

In The Boston Phoenix, rock critic Peter Guralnick declared the book "not worth reading." Guralnick said that "even given factual accuracy, scholarly integrity (a large concession), and thematic core, nothing about this book is true. It misses the point of Elvis’s life, of Elvis’s music, and of our response. It misses the humor, it misses the complexity, it misses the excitement, it misses the awfulness; and it offers as a substitute - what? The rhetoric of loathing. A single unvarying note of contempt." Other critics liked the book, with Jonathan Yardley of The Washington Post calling it a "nasty book, written in spectacularly execrable prose, but the view of Presley that it expressed dovetailed in many instances with my own, and in spite of itself I found things in it to admire."

=== The Lives of John Lennon ===
In The Lives of John Lennon (1988), a product of years of research and hundreds of interviews with many of Lennon's friends, acquaintances, servants and musicians, Goldman juxtaposes John Lennon's talents against his dark side. The book reveals a very personal side of the musician who was prone to faults, such as anger, domestic violence (exemplified by an assistant's allegation that then-girlfriend Yoko Ono's 1968 miscarriage was triggered by a beating from Lennon), drug abuse (including longstanding addictions to cocaine and heroin), adultery, and indecisiveness, but who was also a generational leader. It deals with Lennon's childhood and the impact others had on his life, among them his aunt, Mimi Smith, his father, Fred Lennon, and Johnny Dykins. Goldman implies that strong women ruined Lennon, starting with Smith, and that he was later being held prisoner by Ono (who may have encouraged their mutual heroin addiction as a way of controlling him and his vast fortune to her own ends).

Concerning Goldman's account of Lennon's consumption of LSD, Lucy Sante, in The New York Review of Books, said: "Goldman's background research was either slovenly or nonexistent." Peter Doggett writes in You Never Give Me Your Money: The Battle for the Soul of the Beatles that Goldman's book had many faults, but still managed to capture significant elements of Lennon's life.

=== Unfinished Jim Morrison biography ===
Goldman died of a heart attack on March 28, 1994, while flying from Miami to London. He left unfinished a biography of Doors singer Jim Morrison.

Three years before his death, Penthouse published a long excerpt from his work-in-progress on Morrison. The excerpt focused on documents that Goldman claimed to have obtained from the Paris Police Prefecture regarding the minor police investigation that had been conducted in response to Morrison's wife Pamela Courson's notification that he had died suddenly at the apartment they were renting. According to Goldman, Courson provided a detailed account of the activities she and Morrison had done together throughout the day and night of Friday, July 2, 1971. They included setting up a movie projector and screening their Super 8 film home movies that they had made during a recent trip to Spain.

According to Goldman, Courson seemingly gave police the whole truth about the early-morning hours of Saturday, except that she carefully refrained from admitting that either of them had used narcotics. According to Goldman, she even admitted that Morrison had vomited blood extensively and she grabbed a series of pots from their kitchen to catch all of it, and police believed her claim that this had happened in the middle of the night without the deceased, age 27, being under the influence of narcotics or alcohol.

Goldman's biography of Morrison was never published, nor did a publication other than Penthouse refer to the alleged contents of Paris Police Prefecture documents related to Morrison and Courson. In an obituary in the Los Angeles Daily News, Phil Rosenthal said of Goldman's last project, "At the time of his death, he was picking over Jim Morrison's bones for yet another book."

== In popular culture ==
U2 lead singer Bono referenced his disdain for Goldman in the song "God Part II" from the 1988 album Rattle and Hum:

"Don't believe in Goldman
His type [is] like a curse
Instant Karma's gonna get him
If I don't get him first"

== Partial bibliography ==
- Wagner on Music and Drama (1964; co-edited with Evert Sprinchorn)
- The Mine and the Mint: Sources for the Writings of Thomas de Quincey (1965)
- Freakshow;: The rocksoulbluesjazzsickjewblackhumorsexpoppsych gig and other scenes from the counter-culture (1971; republished as Freakshow: Misadventures in the Counterculture, 1959–1971, 2001)
- Ladies and Gentlemen – Lenny Bruce!! (1974)
- Carnival in Rio (1978)
- Grass Roots: Marijuana in America Today (1979)
- Disco (1979)
- Elvis (1981)
- The Lives of John Lennon (1988)
- Elvis: The Last 24 Hours (1990)
- Sound Bites (1992)
