= The Messiah of Morris Avenue =

2006 novel by Tony Hendra

- First edition cover
- Author: Tony Hendra
- Audio read by: John Bedford Lloyd
- Publisher: Henry Holt
- Publication date: April 4, 2006
- ISBN: 978-0-805-07964-7

The Messiah Of Morris Avenue is a 2006 novel by English satirist Tony Hendra. The novel depicts the Second Coming of Christ in a future United States ruled by the religious right. Tony Hendra has recorded several "Godcasts" recapping the events that have transpired between now and the second coming.

The audiobook was narrated by John Bedford Lloyd.

== Plot summary ==
In the near future, Christianity has dominated everything, including politics, television, the Internet, and film. The leaders of the semi-theocracy include Reverend Jimmy, a televangelist who is the spiritual advisor to the President, and Pastor Bob, a laid-back reverend who is obsessed with golf and competes with Jimmy for spiritual dominance. Ironically, though Jimmy says he has spoken to God about almost everything, their teachings are the opposite of Jesus Christ's ideas of peace, love, and forgiveness towards everyone. Jimmy even claims on his program that bombing Europe will bring the Second Coming.

However, a jaded ex-reporter, Johnny Greco, bitter towards Jimmy, has already found it, in an Irish-Hispanic Catholic named Jay, who performs incredible miracles of healing sick people, preaches against what Christianity has become, and values peace, tolerance, and love for all humans. Dismissive at first, he soon begins to believe in what Jay is saying, and begins to think that Jay truly is "the real deal". Unfortunately for Jay, things happen as they previously did and Jay, some of his closest apostles and Reverend Jim (who Jay converts) are killed. However, Jay's apostles continue to spread the word of his actions and teachings and form a new religion. The book ends:

THE END
AND THE BEGINNING

== Major themes ==
The novel generally questions whether Christianity has truly followed Jesus' teachings of compassion and humanity. Hendra notes that many Christians preach of killing others "in the name of the lord" or justifying homophobia or racism using Jesus' teachings. These ideals are in complete contrast to Jesus' ideals that you must sympathize with the outcasts and unpopular rather than persecuting them, and that you must treat your brother as you yourself would like to be treated.

The Reverend Jimmy is something of a parody of televangelists and spiritual leaders such as Pat Robertson and Jerry Falwell, who have sometimes gone against Jesus' ideals (such as Robertson suggesting the United States assassinate Hugo Chávez).
