= The Lives of John Lennon =

Book by Albert Goldman

- Cover of the first edition
- Author: Albert Goldman
- Language: English
- Subject: John Lennon
- Publication date: 1988
- Publication place: United States
- Media type: Print (Hardcover and Paperback)
- Pages: 719 (877 paperback)
- ISBN: 978-0688047214

The Lives of John Lennon is a 1988 biography of musician John Lennon by American author Albert Goldman. The book is a product of several years of research and hundreds of interviews with Lennon's friends, acquaintances, servants, and musicians. It is best known for its criticism and generally negative representation of the personal lives of Lennon and his wife, Yoko Ono.

Upon its release, the book received negative attention from critics, and was largely dismissed by those who knew Lennon.

== Lennon in the work ==
When first published in 1988, The Lives of John Lennon was controversial because of its portrayal of Lennon in a highly critical light. Lennon was presented in the book as a talented but deeply flawed man who manipulated people and relationships throughout his life, flinging them aside when they were no longer useful to him. Goldman, who was Jewish, also suggested that Lennon was an anti-Semite, that he was a heavy drug user, and that he was dyslexic and schizophrenic.

=== Sexuality ===
The book goes into detail about the long-rumoured homosexual affair between Lennon and The Beatles' manager Brian Epstein (previously discussed in both Pete Shotton’s Lennon in My Life and Peter Brown's The Love You Make), as well as alleging several liaisons by Lennon with other men, including a claim that he solicited underage male prostitutes in Thailand. This latter assertion greatly angered Yoko Ono and Paul McCartney. The book was criticized by Lennon fans for allegedly containing much unsubstantiated conjecture, and tending to present worst-case scenarios when doing so.

=== Violence ===
According to accounts in Goldman's book, Lennon felt guilty over having attacked a sailor he met during the Beatles' time in Hamburg, and also over the sudden death of bandmate Stuart Sutcliffe, whose sister, Pauline, later falsely accused Lennon of murdering him. Goldman also presents a story from an Ono assistant that Ono's 1968 miscarriage was triggered by a beating from Lennon. Other primary sources also support Goldman's claims about Lennon's tendency toward violence, a tendency Lennon himself owned up to in a Playboy interview.

=== Drug use ===
Lennon was a heavy drug user, as has been acknowledged by most people who knew him well, including Ono and Lennon's first wife, Cynthia Lennon. Goldman also claims that when Lennon started making music again in 1980 following a long seclusion, he was not oblivious to Manhattan's cocaine-fueled disco scene. According to Goldman, on the day Lennon was murdered he was scheduled to undergo plastic surgery several days later to repair his nasal septum due to snorting cocaine, which he supposedly did at the Hit Factory recording studio where he and Ono recorded their album Double Fantasy. Goldman does not cite anyone who might have witnessed this at the studio.

Goldman alleges further that on December 8, 1980 (the day of Lennon's murder) not only did the singer's cocaine-snorting warrant plastic surgery, but he was in such bad physical condition from drug abuse and lack of exercise that during his autopsy the medical examiner recorded observations to that effect, overlooking the five bullet wounds momentarily.

Goldman further asserts that this drug-addled, dangerously unhealthy isolation was a result of Lennon's natural laziness and dependence on strong women throughout his life. Goldman also claims that Lennon’s isolation and physical decline were instigated by Yoko Ono, who Goldman claims was jealous of Lennon and saw his fame as competition for her musical ambitions.

=== Musical achievement and public image ===
Goldman does show genuine respect for Lennon's musical achievements with the Beatles and his solo work (although he dismisses the widely acclaimed "Imagine"). Lennon's copyright infringement lawsuit for "Come Together" is also explored in the text.

The overarching theme of the book is to debunk the notion that Lennon retired from the music business for five years, from 1975 until the rehearsals for his 1980 comeback album, Double Fantasy, to live as a "househusband," as Rolling Stone magazine and Playboy described him, and to raise the couple's son, Sean. Goldman asserts that in reality, a drug-addicted Lennon retreated into a secluded, darkened room in Manhattan's Dakota building watching television all day, every day, leaving domestic servants to tend to his son, while Ono was feeding a chronic heroin habit and managing his share of profits from the Beatles’ music. This portrayal is supported by Robert Rosen's book Nowhere Man: The Final Days of John Lennon, a controversial book which is supposedly based on the author's "memories of reading Lennon's diaries" from the months and weeks leading up to his murder. These diaries have never been made public.

Goldman quotes Harold Seider, Lennon's lawyer for the last few years of his life, as saying that much of Lennon's public image was largely fabricated:

The real Lennon was not the public statements that he made. They were made because they were public statements, and he was looking to make a point. He couldn't give a shit (about lying) because, to a certain extent, he had contempt for the media. After all, they bought all the crap. He was there to manipulate the media. He enjoyed doing that. He understood how to use the media. You got to give him credit for that, and you got to give her credit... They would use the media, but it was not that they believed it, but that was the image they wanted to present.

== Others in the work ==
Cynthia Lennon claims that the material for Goldman's depiction of her and Lennon's marriage was taken from her book A Twist of Lennon and given a negative spin. Writing in the Los Angeles Times, reviewer Jon Wiener points out that Goldman recounts many incidents already available to fans in May Pang's book Loving John and John Green's Dakota Days, and from John himself in interviews and autobiographical song lyrics. Wiener also reveals that Goldman worked closely with the Lennons' former assistant Fred Seaman, who had served five years probation for grand larceny after pleading guilty to looting John's personal belongings and diaries after his death. Seaman had prepared his biography of John, only to have Simon & Schuster refuse to publish it; he then began collaborating with Goldman.

Goldman depicts Paul McCartney in an extremely positive light, as being the only true talent among the Beatles, and the man who made the band able to function. On January 16, 1980, customs officials in Japan found 7.7 ounces (218.3 g) of cannabis in McCartney's luggage as he and the other musicians in Wings tried to enter the country for a concert tour. Goldman asserts that this incident was orchestrated by Yoko Ono. She supposedly had advance notice that her husband's friend would be smuggling drugs into her homeland. She allegedly made overseas telephone calls to government officials she knew with the hope that he would be arrested, thereby giving her a good excuse to forbid her husband from communicating with his friend. More controversially, Goldman depicts manager Allen Klein as someone who had the Beatles' best interests in mind, and who was railroaded by the U.S. Securities and Exchange Commission when he was tried, convicted, and served prison time for insider trading and securities fraud.

Goldman implies that Mark David Chapman's murder of John Lennon may have been part of a conspiracy by fundamentalist Christians. Chapman was a fundamentalist who viewed Lennon as a corrupter of youth. Goldman does not offer any conclusions but mentions that the NYPD files on Lennon's murder are sealed and any conclusive answer would have to wait until the files are released to the public.

=== Yoko Ono ===
Lennon comes across much better than Yoko Ono, for whom Goldman shows unbridled contempt. Goldman insults Ono's appearance, describing her as "simian-looking". Goldman alleges that Ono had been a prostitute while attending Sarah Lawrence College, and depicts her as a willing participant in various alleged crimes of her previous husband, Tony Cox. Goldman also goes into great detail about Ono's treatment of Lennon's first wife Cynthia, and Ono's unconventional behavior and personality. Goldman also depicts Ono as pressuring Lennon into heroin use, as greedy and stingy, and indulging in infidelity with gigolos.

Goldman contends Ono encouraged Lennon's heroin addiction as a way of controlling him and his vast fortune, to her ends. She also supposedly used tarot-reading charlatans to feed Lennon readings that would urge him to take various courses of action Ono supported. These readings would determine seemingly trivial choices of Lennon's life, such as which route their limousine would take to transport them home from the studio or which day was most propitious on which to record music, but were, in fact, according to Goldman, often part of Ono's constant machinations. Ono's concern for routes and directions reflects a belief in Japanese traditional katatagae, but this is overlooked by Goldman, who has been accused of racism.

Goldman also alleges Lennon's musical comeback in 1980 was only allowed, and then orchestrated, by Ono after she realized her ambitions for performing music on the A list without Lennon were futile.

Goldman also enumerates what he describes as Ono's lavish spending habits, wasting of Lennon's resources, abuse of domestic servants and personal assistants, even to the point of setting up May Pang as Lennon's girlfriend during his Lost Weekend when he was separated from Ono from mid-1973 to February 1975. These claims by Goldman were largely based on allegations made by Pang herself in her book, Loving John.

== Criticism ==
=== By those who knew Lennon ===
Yoko Ono threatened to sue for libel, claiming the book made her briefly consider suicide, but never pursued any legal action, later stating that she wanted to maintain a positive attitude and that her lawyers had advised her a civil action would only draw more attention to the book.

Cynthia Lennon denounced the book, stating that "Every single person was annihilated. My mother was called a bulldog and a domineering woman, which was nothing—nothing—like my mother. And he called me a spaniel. I thought, I'd rather be a spaniel than a Rottweiler, which is what he was."

Other celebrities who had known Lennon personally, including Geraldo Rivera and Tom Snyder, also largely dismissed the book. An uncredited review on UPI dated September 12, 1988, observes that Goldman expresses "deep contempt" for Lennon, his family, the other Beatles, and rock music in general; that he resorted to the "sleaziest methods" to dig up dirt on Lennon; and that he engages in "schoolyard name-calling" and seems obsessed with Lennon's sex life. Artist and friend of Lennon David Vaughan derided the book in an interview with Goldman, calling it "846 pages of pure venom".

Despite Goldman's praise of him in the book, Paul McCartney did not return the favour and condemned Goldman's account of his old bandmate, telling fans and the press "Look, don't buy it." He also called it "a piece of trash" and claimed Goldman made up "any old bunch of lies he sees fit". George Harrison, Lennon's former bandmate, criticized the book and Goldman, stating that Goldman was "slagging off someone who's dead". Singer-songwriter Harry Nilsson, whose friendship with Lennon peaked during his 1974 separation from Ono, told Rolling Stone that Goldman "got me drunk" while interviewing him, probing Nilsson for "dirt" about Lennon, and Nilsson would not cooperate. (Nilsson gets a chapter in the book, "Harry the Hustler", which credits him with having better confidence-man skills than singing talent.) John Lennon's close friend Cilla Black said she was never interviewed by Goldman or his assistants, questioning the accuracy of the book and Goldman's claim to have interviewed over 1,000 people who knew Lennon well. Sean Lennon called the book "trash" by an author who "is a twat who just made things up to be controversial".

=== By other biographers of Lennon ===
In Ray Coleman's Lennon: The Definitive Biography, there appears the following quote from The Beatles' record producer George Martin: "I think it is iniquitous that people can libel the dead. If John was alive, that book would not have come out. It is largely untrue, but, sadly, if mud is thrown it tends to stick." Martin also labeled the book as "codswallop".

Author Philip Norman, whose own biography of Lennon (John Lennon: The Life) was published 20 years after The Lives of John Lennon, described Goldman's book as "malevolent" and "risibly ignorant".

=== Rolling Stone ===
The October 20, 1988, issue of Rolling Stone lambasted the book in a lengthy and extensively researched article by David Fricke and Jeffrey Ressner, "Imaginary Lennon". The reviewers described the book as "riddled with factual inaccuracies, embroidered accounts of true events that border on fiction and suspect information provided by tainted sources". Further, Fricke and Ressner stated that "Rolling Stone spoke to sources interviewed by Goldman who said that they were misquoted or that the information they provided him was used out of context. Other figures close to Lennon who refused to speak to Goldman or were not contacted by him claim that incidents in the book in which they appear either never happened or did not occur in the way Goldman recounts them." Among the factual errors listed by Rolling Stone:

- Guitarist Danny Kortchmar denies Lennon ever bit him on the nose (to be fair to Goldman, he doesn't make that claim himself, he is merely quoting Mac Rebennack, a.k.a. Dr John, who makes the allegation of nose-biting.)
- Goldman source Tony Monero denies Lennon ever told him to "Suck my cock!"
- Apple executive Tony King denies Lennon snorted cocaine before his 1974 concert appearance with Elton John
- Goldman incorrectly describes the Lennons' kitchen stove as match-lit when recounting an anecdote of Lennon trying to set Ono's hair on fire
- Goldman incorrectly describes the "Love Me Do" single as a 78 instead of a 45.

=== Sourcing ===
Louis Menand in The New Republic described the sourcing of Goldman's book as "vague and unreliable". Menand wrote in Goldman's book that "The little things don't matter, of course, if the big things can be trusted. But the big things can't." Lucy Sante, in The New York Review of Books, said about the account of Lennon's consumption of LSD in the book: "Goldman's background research was either slovenly or nonexistent," and that the only establishing quote for the LSD story was "from a novel called Groupie (author unidentified)".

== Defence ==
Goldman denounced the Rolling Stone article as "a farrago of groundless or insignificant charges designed to discredit my biography of John Lennon". He also mocked what he called "the stupidity of the [Newsweek] magazine employees who were assigned the task of smearing me and my book", and concluded by saying that Sante was "a young man of no reputation in the field of popular culture". Sante replied that Goldman's tirade proved that the book was a gigantic, humorous "put-on".

David Gates responded in Newsweek by reminding readers that a romantic vision of Lennon is just as much of a myth as Goldman's portrayal. Editor Jann Wenner is quoted as saying that the book "offended him at every level", suggesting that he as a personal friend of the Lennons had good reason to want to preserve an idealistic version of Lennon's life. However, by stating several easily researched facts, the article also exposes many of Goldman's inaccuracies and concludes with a reminder that the best way to know Lennon is through his recordings. Gates noted in the article that Goldman presents no evidence for his claim that Lennon patronized male prostitutes in Thailand or that Lennon killed a sailor in Hamburg, and only secondhand hearsay for the tale of Lennon blaming himself for Stuart Sutcliffe's death.

Peter Doggett writes in You Never Give Me Your Money: The Battle for the Soul of the Beatles that Goldman's book possessed many faults, but still managed to capture significant elements of Lennon's life:

The Lives of John Lennon was lousy with errors of fact and interpretation, speculative in the extreme, ill-willed, and awash with snobbery. Yet Goldman pinpointed Lennon's almost clinical need for domination by a strong woman; the dark ambiguity of a man of peace being governed by violence, either vented or repressed; the unmistakable decline in his work after he left England in 1971; and the instinctive need to believe in a force greater than himself, which led him from guru to guru, each obsession spilling into disillusionment and creative despair.

Historians Michael Brocken and Melissa Davis took a more nuanced perspective on Goldman's book than most critics, writing in The Beatles Bibliography that "...the primary research concerning Lennon's early years was of the very highest quality; it was simply not well served by its author."

== References to the book in other media ==
On their 1988 album Rattle and Hum, U2 attacked Goldman's allegations about Lennon in the song "God Part II", a "sequel" of sorts to Lennon's song "God", with the lyrics "Don't believe in Goldman/his type is like a curse/Instant karma's gonna get him if I don't get him first."

An October 1988 episode of Saturday Night Live featured a sketch revolving around why Goldman wrote the book, claiming it was in retaliation for the Beatles kicking him out of the band in 1962. Phil Hartman played Goldman (on trombone), Dana Carvey played Paul McCartney, Dennis Miller (in a rare non-"Weekend Update" role) played George Harrison, Jon Lovitz played Ringo Starr, and guest host Matthew Broderick played John Lennon. In the sketch, another subject of Goldman's, Elvis Presley (played by Kevin Nealon), is the one who urges Lennon to fire Goldman.
