= ABC's Nightlife =

American late-night television talk show

- Also known as: ABC's Nightlife with Les Crane
- Genre: Talk show
- Presented by: Various; Les Crane (June–November 1965), Nipsey Russell
- Country of origin: United States
- Original language: English

Production
- Running time: 105 minutes

Original release
- Network: ABC
- Release: March 1 – November 12, 1965

Related
- The Les Crane Show

ABC's Nightlife is an American late-night talk show that aired on ABC from March 1 to November 12, 1965. It replaced The Les Crane Show in ABC's late-night schedule and was another attempt by the network to compete with NBC's The Tonight Show Starring Johnny Carson.

The program initially used a rotating series of guest hosts, beginning with comedian Shelley Berman. Other hosts included William B. Williams, Nipsey Russell, Pat Boone, Allan Sherman, Dave Garroway, Louis Nye and Bill Cullen. Les Crane, whose previous program had occupied the time slot, returned as the regular host in June 1965, with Russell appearing as a co-host.

== History ==
ABC announced in February 1965 that it was canceling The Les Crane Show, which had failed to attract a sufficient audience against The Tonight Show, and would replace it with a reformatted program called ABC's Nightlife. The new program began on March 1, 1965, airing Monday through Friday from 11:15 p.m. to 1 a.m. Rather than having a permanent host, ABC initially planned to use a succession of performers and personalities, with Berman hosting the first week.

The rotating hosts included Williams, Russell, Jimmy Cannon, Boone, Sherman, Garroway, Nye, Dick Shawn, Jack Carter, Jan Murray, Eddy Arnold and Cullen.

In June 1965, ABC brought Crane back to its late-night schedule as the regular host of Nightlife, with Russell appearing alongside him. The revised program placed greater emphasis on entertainment than Crane's previous series, which had been known for audience participation and discussion of political and social issues.

== Format ==
Nightlife combined interviews, comedy and musical performances. During the program's initial months, its changing hosts gave individual weeks different styles and formats. Orchestra leaders during the run included Cy Coleman, Elliot Lawrence and Donn Trenner.

After Crane returned, Russell became a regular on-air presence and the program retained elements of the conventional late-night talk-show format, including an opening monologue, interviews and performances. The show continued to compete directly with Carson's Tonight on NBC.

== Cancelation ==
ABC's Nightlife failed to establish a sufficiently large audience in the late-night time slot and ABC canceled the program in November 1965. Its final broadcast aired on November 12.

Following the cancelation, ABC withdrew from regularly scheduled late-night entertainment programming for more than a year. The network returned to the time period on April 17, 1967, with The Joey Bishop Show, another attempt to compete with Carson.
