= Norman Rose =

American actor (1917–2004)

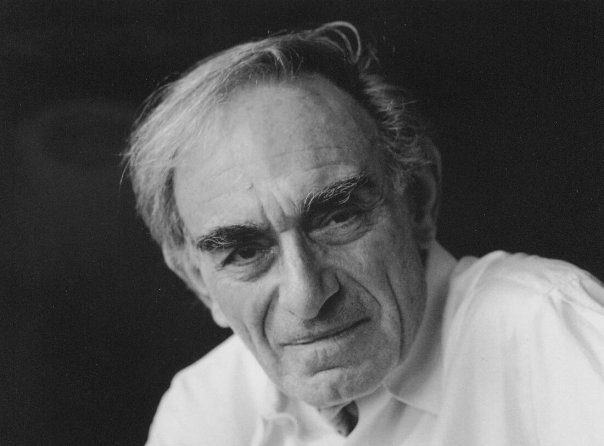
- Rose in 1997
- Born: June 23, 1917; Philadelphia, Pennsylvania, U.S.
- Died: November 12, 2004 (aged 87); Upper Nyack, New York, U.S.
- Education: George Washington University; Actors Studio Drama School
- Occupations: Actor; announcer; drama instructor; narrator
- Known for: Announcer for National Federation of Coffee Growers of Colombia commercials
- Notable work: Lights Out (1946); Radio Days (1987); The Front (1976)
- Spouse: Catherine Vagnoni
- Children: 4

Norman Rose (June 23, 1917 – November 12, 2004) was an American actor, film narrator and radio announcer whose velvety baritone was often called "the Voice of God" by colleagues. He was best known as the narrator's voice in the fictitious coffee grower's Juan Valdez Colombian coffee television commercials and the announcer-narrator of NBC's Dimension X.

Born in Philadelphia, Pennsylvania, Rose started acting while a student at George Washington University in Washington, DC. Rose honed his craft at the Actors Studio in New York, then landed parts in plays on and off-Broadway.

Rose was the narrator for the satirical 1972 hit song Deteriorata, which was recorded by comedy group National Lampoon for the album Radio Dinner. He also recorded numerous books for the blind and narrated the 70th anniversary broadcast of the Academy Awards. He also was a drama instructor at the Juilliard School.

== Radio ==
During World War II, he was recruited by the United States Office of War Information to work as a radio newscaster. After the war, Rose lent his distinctive voice to radio programs such as Dimension X and CBS Radio Mystery Theater. He narrated the short film Harold and the Purple Crayon in 1959, and provided several of the voices on the 1963 CBS cartoon Tennessee Tuxedo and His Tales.

In 1948, Rose co-founded New Stages, an off-Broadway repertory company, with producer David Heilweil. New Stages presented the American debut of Jean-Paul Sartre's best-known play, The Respectful Prostitute, prior to its Broadway run. Rose was an accomplished stage actor appearing in Broadway productions of Richard III and St. Joan and off-Broadway in The Brothers Karamazov.

From 1969 to 1974, Rose stepped in front of the camera to portray the same character—psychiatrist Dr. Marcus Polk—on two ABC soap operas (One Life to Live and All My Children). He also appeared in the soap operas The Edge of Night and Search for Tomorrow.

In addition to his work as the announcer of numerous TV commercials, Rose was one of the voices of promotional announcements for the NBC and later ABC television networks from the late 1960s through the early 1990s.

== Film ==
Nicknamed “The Voice of God” by colleagues because of his deep, recognizable voice, Rose was the voice of "Death" in Woody Allen's 1975 comedy Love and Death. Rose's other film work includes Woody Allen's Radio Days and the narration for director Kinji Fukasaku's Message from Space (1978), narrating the English dub of the 1968 Soviet Union production of War and Peace and Ishirō Honda's Destroy All Monsters, as well as a newsreel announcer in Mike Nichols’ Biloxi Blues (1988). On screen he was seen in The Joe Louis Story (1953), The Violators (1957), Jump (1971), Sidney Lumet’s The Anderson Tapes (1971), Who Killed Mary What’s Her Name? (1971) and Martin Ritt's The Front (1976) (also starring Woody Allen). He also narrated the 1989 film documentary How Hitler Lost the War, which was produced by David Hoffman.

Rose was also the offscreen narrator for the telecast of Mikhail Baryshnikov's production of the ballet The Nutcracker (1977), a production that has been repeated many times on television and is available on DVD.

== Death ==
Norman Rose died November 12, 2004, at his home in Upper Nyack, New York.

== Filmography ==
Year	Title	Role	Notes
1953	The Joe Louis Story	Lieutenant	
1957	The Violators	Stephen	
1961	The Colossus of Rhodes		Voice, Uncredited
1965	Pinocchio in Outer Space	Prologue Narrator #1	Voice
1966	War and Peace	English Narrator	
1971	Jump	Dutchman	
1971	The Anderson Tapes	Mr. Longene	
1971	The Telephone Book	Mr. Smith	
1971	Who Killed Mary What’s Her Name?	Doctor Barkunian	
1975	Love and Death	Death	Voice, Uncredited
1976	The Front	Howard's Attorney	
1978	Message from Space	Opening Narrator	English version, Voice
1987	Radio Days	Radio	Voice
1988	Biloxi Blues	Newsreel Announcer	
