= You Never Give Me Your Money (book) =

2009 book by Peter Doggett

- Author: Peter Doggett
- Language: English
- Subject: The Beatles, Apple Corps
- Genre: Biography, music
- Publisher: The Bodley Head
- Publication date: 14 September 2009
- Publication place: United Kingdom
- Media type: Print (hardcover)
- ISBN: 978-1-847920744 (hardback)

You Never Give Me Your Money is a book by author and music journalist Peter Doggett about the break-up of the English rock band the Beatles and its aftermath. The book was published in the United Kingdom by The Bodley Head in September 2009, and by HarperStudio in the United States in 2010. In the UK, it was subtitled The Battle for the Soul of The Beatles, while the subtitle for US editions was The Beatles After the Breakup.

== Contents ==
You Never Give Me Your Money discusses the events leading up to the Beatles' break-up in April 1970, starting with the death of the band's manager, Brian Epstein, in August 1967. It tells of the confusion inherent in their Apple Corps business enterprise and how, within a year, the company's precarious financial position attracted the interest of Allen Klein, whose managerial appointment further divided the band members.

Doggett documents the myriad lawsuits that began with Paul McCartney's 1971 action in London's High Court to dissolve the Beatles' partnership and extricate himself from Klein's control, and from 1973 onwards saw John Lennon, George Harrison and Ringo Starr reversing their position on Klein and becoming embroiled in litigation with him in courts in London and New York. Following Lennon's death and a lawsuit against Capitol Records in the 1980s, the surviving Beatles unite to realise a common purpose in protecting their financial interests. The book also documents the highly successful Beatles Anthology project in the 1990s and other legacy-related campaigns.

== Research and writing ==
In his author's acknowledgments in You Never Give Me Your Money, Doggett says that he actively researched for the book over "one intensive year" but otherwise drew on his 30-year experience as a music journalist. When writing the book, Doggett drew on many interviews, including with Beatle wives and family members such as Yoko Ono, Cynthia Lennon, Louise Harrison and Mike McCartney, Apple insiders Derek Taylor, Neil Aspinall and Alistair Taylor, and musical associates such as George Martin, James Taylor and Leon Russell. In his acknowledgments, Doggett also lists Tony Barrow and Alexis Mardas, among others, and highlights Klein's colleague Allan Steckler as "an invaluable last-minute discovery ... with an intimate grasp of the Apple/ABKCO relationship".

Throughout 2010 and 2011, Doggett maintained a blog dedicated to discussing the book and items related to the Beatles. In a post written in July 2010, he said that he had set out to write You Never Give Me Your Money without any bias towards any one of the former Beatles but that during the writing process, "I felt saddest and sorriest for Paul McCartney – even while I was highlighting things that he might have done and said differently." Adding that some customer reviews on Amazon had claimed he showed favouritism towards, variously, Lennon, Harrison or Starr, yet none identified "any special sympathy" for McCartney in his text, Doggett concluded: "[It] just goes to prove that the book you're writing, and the book you THINK you're writing, can be two very different things."

According to Beatles historian Erin Torkelson Weber, You Never Give Me Your Money depicts the four former bandmates with equal weight given to positive and negative aspects of their characters and actions. She says that, in keeping with a general trend in Beatles literature, it challenges the hagiographic image of Lennon established by Philip Norman's book Shout! in 1981, yet without "gloating over Lennon's struggles" in the fashion of Albert Goldman's 1988 biography, The Lives of John Lennon. Similarly, according to Weber, Doggett criticises the manner of McCartney's attempts to revise the band's history, describing some of his actions as "graceless", yet he "acknowledges the legitimacy" of McCartney's claim.

== Publication and reception ==
The book's publication coincided with the release of the Beatles' remastered catalogue on CD, on 9 September 2009, and the release of the computer game The Beatles: Rock Band. The Independent said the book was "enthralling" and "impossible to put down", while the Sunday Herald remarked on its "gripping narrative" and deemed it "the most important book on its subject since Revolution in the Head".

In her review for The Independent, Liz Thomson likened You Never Give Me Your Money to a sequel to The Longest Cocktail Party, Richard DiLello's 1972 memoir covering the early years of Apple Corps, adding: "Doggett's arcane detail will be too much for all but diehard fans, but what's most striking is the naiveté of the four men at the heart of the story." Sinclair McKay of The Daily Telegraph described the book as "thoroughly engrossing" and found the author's treatment of the individual protagonists, including the former Beatles, Ono, Linda McCartney and Klein, "admirably even-handed" since "everyone comes in for a pasting." Writing for New Statesman, Jude Rogers said that Doggett offered a new perspective on the Beatles by focusing on the commercial aspect of their legacy, adding: "by subtitling his book The Battle for the Soul of the Beatles, he is also showing us that he is on their side, keen to preserve their special musical alchemy while unravelling the myths that surround them as people." She said that, while the narrative can be as complex as the band's business concerns, Doggett excels in "quietly laying bare" the double standards behind the individuals' actions. According to Doggett, in the same July 2010 blog post, the book's only unfavourable review up to that point was a piece in The Mail on Sunday by Hunter Davies, author of the Beatles' 1968 self-titled authorised biography.

David Ulin of the Los Angeles Times described the book as "elegant and deeply researched", and especially praised the author's "sense of the textures, the delicate interplay of individual and collective history, that continued to define the members of the Beatles long after they had ceased to function as a cohesive entity". He also said that, while the narrative focuses on the group's financial empire and offers a revealing picture of the protagonists' behaviour, "to Doggett's credit, we never lose our sympathy for complicated people hurt by what's gone on." Marjorie Kehe, writing in The Christian Science Monitor, similarly found Doggett's tone "always respectful and often rather affectionate" towards the former Beatles, and said that by drawing on viewpoints from several other individuals in their circle, he creates "a sophisticated narrative that recognizes that the mistakes and miscues were too multiple to attribute to any one figure". Kehe wrote that although Lennon and McCartney, particularly, come across as equally selfish, "[Readers] can be grateful that, if the Beatles' story must be told, it has fallen into a pair of hands as capable and caring as those of Doggett."

In December 2010, You Never Give Me Your Money was included in the Los Angeles Times' top ten books of the year, as chosen by Ulin. According to Erin Torkelson Weber, writing in 2016, You Never Give Me Your Money is "one of the most influential books in all Beatles historiography". Writing for Pitchfork in 2018, Stephen Thomas Erlewine included it in his selection of the "best Beatles books". He concluded of its account of the band's post-1970 lawsuits and the struggle for commercial control of the Beatles' legacy into the 21st century: "As these grimy economic particulars constitute largely unexplored territory in Beatles books, You Never Give Me Your Money is riveting in a unique way, as Doggett's clean and lucid style turns courtroom battles and petty grievances into high drama."
