= Going Too Far =

1987 book by Tony Hendra

Going Too Far: the Rise and Demise of Sick, Gross, Black, Sophomoric, Weirdo, Pinko, Anarchist, Underground, Anti-establishment Humor
- Author: Tony Hendra
- Cover artist: Rick Meyerowitz
- Language: English
- Publisher: Dolphin Doubleday
- Publication date: 1987
- Publication place: United States
- Media type: Print
- Pages: 480
- ISBN: 978-0-385-23223-4

Going Too Far: the Rise and Demise of Sick, Gross, Black, Sophomoric, Weirdo, Pinko, Anarchist, Underground, Anti-establishment Humor is a 1987 American non-fiction book by British-born humorist Tony Hendra about black humor, what Hendra calls "boomer humor", a twisted style of humor that was popular with the baby boomer generation. Going Too Far was published by Dolphin Doubleday in New York.

In the book, Hendra talks about the history of anti-establishment humor, starting with pioneers such as Mort Sahl and Lenny Bruce and also later comics such as John Belushi and Eddie Murphy. Hendra also discusses improvisational theater groups, including The Second City, and popular anti-establishment magazines such as National Lampoon magazine and Mad Magazine.

The book is also partly a memoir about Hendra's time at National Lampoon magazine. The second half of the book (Part Two–Fusion) is primarily about the magazine and its related projects.
