= Desiderata =

1920s prose poem by Max Ehrman

"Desiderata" (Latin: 'things desired') is a 1927 prose poem by the American writer Max Ehrmann. The text was widely distributed in poster form in the 1960s and 1970s.

== History ==
Max Ehrmann of Terre Haute, Indiana, started writing the work in 1921, but he did not assign it a title. He registered for his U.S. copyright in 1927 using the poem's first phrase as its title. The April 5, 1933, issue of Michigan Tradesman magazine published the full, original text on its cover, crediting Ehrmann as its author. In 1933, he distributed the poem in the form of a Christmas card, now officially titled "Desiderata."

Psychiatrist Merrill Moore distributed more than 1,000 unattributed copies to his patients and soldiers during World War II. After Ehrmann died in 1945, his widow published the work in 1948 in The Poems of Max Ehrmann. The 1948 version was in the form of one long prose paragraph, so earlier and later versions were presumably also in that form.

The Reverend Frederick Kates distributed about 200 unattributed copies as devotional materials for his congregation at Old Saint Paul's Church, Baltimore during 1959 or 1960. The papers mentioned the church's foundation date of 1692, which has caused many to falsely assume that the date is that of the poem's origination.

The text was widely distributed in poster form in the 1960s and 1970s, often with the incorrect date of 1692. It was first partitioned into a few subparagraphs separated by "distinctive spacing figures" in 1970 by Pro Arts and Crescendo Publishers. Later, it was divided into four or more subparagraphs separated by new lines in DePauw University's Mirage for 1978 and in the July/August 1999 issue of The Saturday Evening Post. In some versions, almost all instances of "and" are replaced by ampersands. Other versions change "the noise and the haste" to "the noise and haste" and change "be cheerful" to "be careful," notably in the 1971 spoken-word recording by Les Crane.

== Copyright status ==
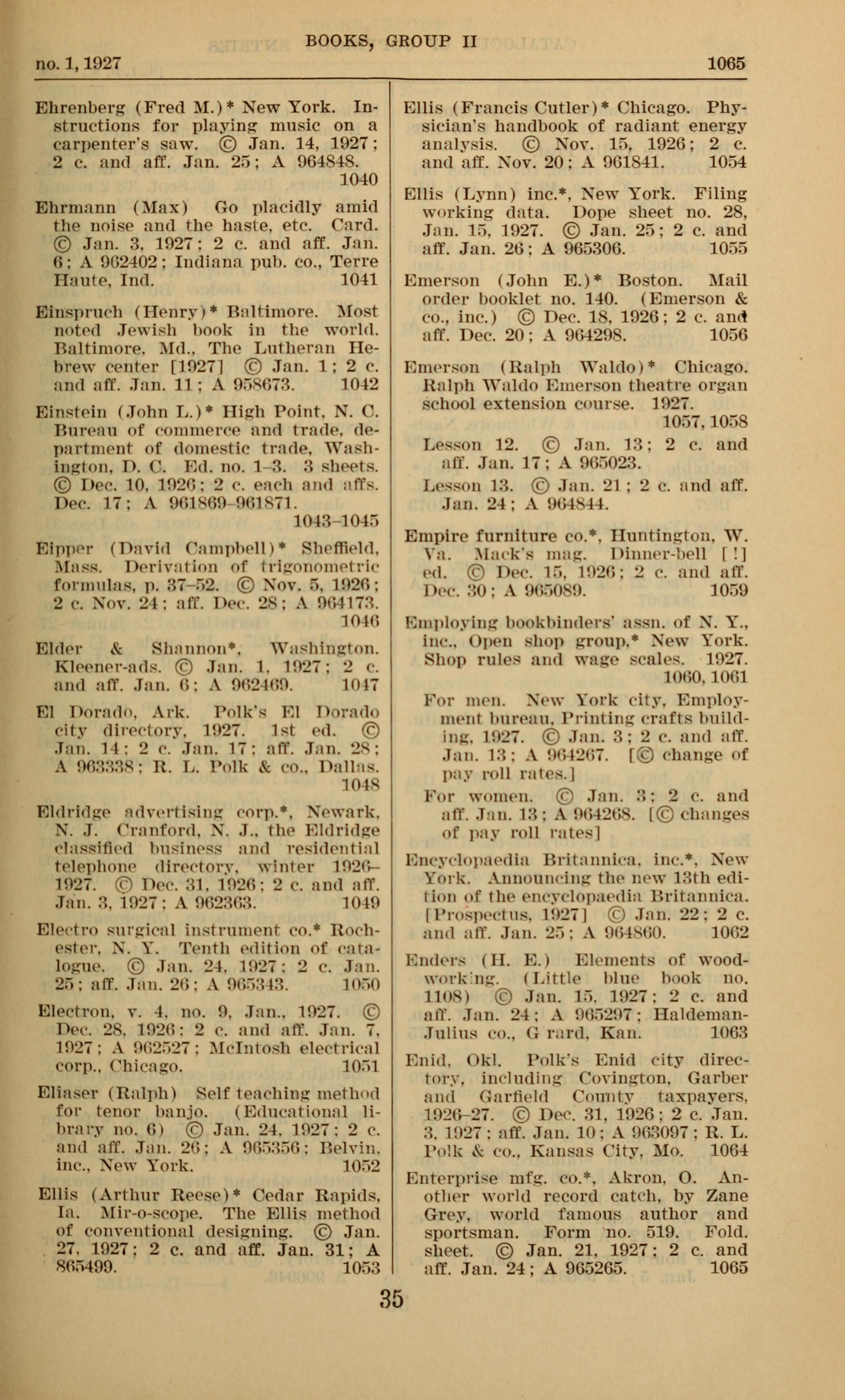
1927 copyright registration

Ehrmann's widow renewed the copyright in 1954. In 1967, Robert L. Bell acquired the publishing rights from Bruce Humphries Publishing Company, and then bought the copyright from Richard Wright, nephew and heir to the Ehrmann work.

In August 1971, the poem was published in Success Unlimited magazine without permission from Bell. In a 1975 lawsuit against the magazine's publisher Combined Registry Co., the court ruled that copyright had been forfeited because the poem had been authorized for publication without a copyright notice in 1933 and 1942, meaning that the poem was therefore in the public domain. The ruling was upheld by the Seventh Circuit Court of Appeals and was denied consideration by the Supreme Court. However, Bell refused to recognize the ruling. As the decision was only valid in the appeals court's jurisdiction of Indiana, Illinois, and Wisconsin, Bell continued to litigate in other jurisdictions, seeking removal of the poem from offending publications or payment of royalties.

The poem is now officially in the public domain throughout the U.S., as written works registered before 1928 entered the public domain in 2023.

== Significant usages of the poem ==
- When former Illinois governor and U.S. ambassador to the United Nations Adlai Stevenson died in 1965, a copy of the poem was found near his bedside, as he had planned to use it in his Christmas cards. This discovery contributed further to the poem's popularity.
- In 1971, Fred Werner added music and the talk show host and actor Les Crane recorded a spoken-word version of the poem as the lead track on the album Desiderata. His producers had assumed that the poem was too old to be copyrighted, but the publicity surrounding the record led to clarification of Ehrmann's authorship and the eventual payment of royalties. Crane and Werner's version peaked in the United States at no. 8 on the Billboard Hot 100 chart in November 1971. The following month, it reached no. 4 in both Australia and Canada. The song reached no. 7 in the UK singles chart in February 1972
- A Spanish-language recording by Mexican actor Arturo Benavides topped the Mexican charts for six weeks in 1972.
- Following his government's loss of majority in the 1972 Canadian federal election, prime minister Pierre Trudeau reassured the nation by quoting Desiderata: "Whether or not it is clear to you, no doubt the universe is unfolding as it should."
- In 2010, Ehrmann's hometown of Terre Haute, Indiana, unveiled a bronze statue by Bill Wolfe of Ehrmann sitting on a park bench.
- In a 2012 interview on Oprah Winfrey's Master Class television special, actor Morgan Freeman explained how deeply the poem had shaped his life.

== See also ==
- Deteriorata
