= The Les Crane Show =

American late-night talk show

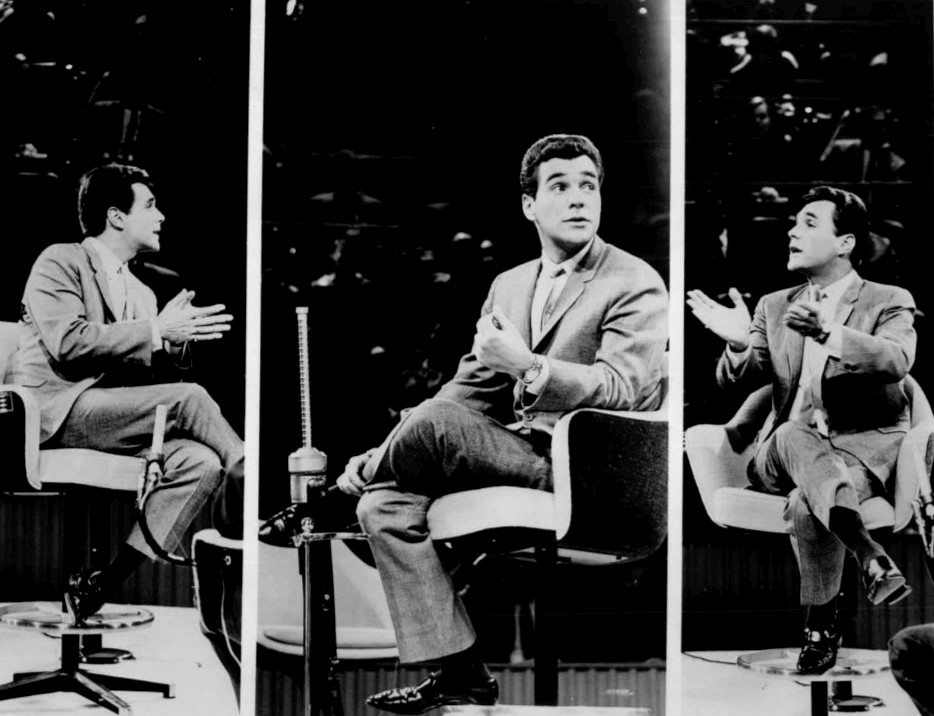
- Crane on the program in 1964
- Genre: Talk show
- Presented by: Les Crane
- Country of origin: United States
- Original language: English

Production
- Running time: 105 minutes

Original release
- Network: ABC
- Release: November 9, 1964 – February 26, 1965

Related
- ABC's Nightlife

The Les Crane Show is an American late-night talk show hosted by Les Crane that aired on ABC from November 9, 1964, to February 26, 1965. Developed as a competitor to NBC's The Tonight Show Starring Johnny Carson, the program combined celebrity interviews and entertainment with discussions of political and social issues and extensive participation by its studio audience.

Crane conducted interviews from the middle of a theater-in-the-round studio using a long "shotgun" microphone that allowed him to move among audience members and involve them in discussions. Guests included Malcolm X, Martin Luther King Jr., Robert F. Kennedy, George Wallace, Ayn Rand, Johnny Cash and Bob Dylan.

The program failed to attract an audience comparable to Carson's and ABC removed Crane as host in February 1965. ABC reformatted the time slot as ABC's Nightlife, initially using a rotation of guest hosts. Crane later returned to Nightlife as a host in June 1965.

== Background ==
Crane began hosting the late-night Night Line on ABC's New York station WABC-TV in 1963. Airing after midnight, the program featured interviews and telephone calls from viewers and developed a reputation for discussing subjects rarely addressed on television at the time.

In August 1964, ABC tested Crane in a week-long late-night series carried by its five owned television stations. Following the trial, the network announced that Crane would receive a regular national program beginning November 9.

ABC scheduled The Les Crane Show from 11:15 p.m. to 1 a.m., Monday through Friday, placing it directly against NBC's The Tonight Show Starring Johnny Carson. By late October, ABC reported that 89 affiliates had agreed to carry the program and expected at least 95 by its premiere, giving the show coverage of approximately 75 percent of the United States. The regular network series premiered on November 9, 1964.

== Format ==
The Les Crane Show differed from the entertainment-oriented format of The Tonight Show Starring Johnny Carson by placing greater emphasis on interviews and discussions of current political and social issues. The program used a theater-in-the-round arrangement, with Crane seated on a revolving stool in the center of an arena-like studio surrounded by the audience. The production staff referred to the setting as the "bear pit".

Audience participation was a prominent part of the program. Crane moved through the studio carrying a long directional microphone, known as his "shotgun microphone", which he pointed toward audience members so they could question or respond to guests. The microphone became one of Crane's trademarks.

Crane's interviews frequently involved opposing viewpoints and controversial subjects rather than conventional celebrity promotion. His questioning was direct and sometimes confrontational, contributing to his reputation as the "bad boy of late-night television". The program nevertheless included entertainment segments alongside its discussions, including comedians, actors and musical performers.

== Notable guests and broadcasts ==
The program featured political figures, civil rights leaders, writers, actors and musicians, often in discussions rather than conventional promotional interviews. Guests included Martin Luther King Jr., Malcolm X, Robert F. Kennedy, George Wallace, Ayn Rand, Richard Burton, Johnny Cash and Bob Dylan.

Malcolm X appeared on the December 28, 1964 broadcast. Rand appeared during 1964 to discuss her recently published essay collection The Virtue of Selfishness.

Cash appeared on the program on February 9, 1965. Dylan appeared on February 17, 1965, in one of his relatively rare television appearances of the period. He performed "It's All Over Now, Baby Blue" and "It's Alright, Ma (I'm Only Bleeding)" and was interviewed by Crane.

== Reception and cancellation ==
The program attracted attention for Crane's interview style and its willingness to feature controversial subjects, but critical reaction was mixed. Crane was frequently described as the "bad boy of late-night television", while some reviewers praised his direct questioning and others found the program's confrontational style and audience participation distracting.

Despite the publicity surrounding the show, it failed to attract an audience large enough to compete successfully with The Tonight Show Starring Johnny Carson. ABC announced in February 1965 that Crane would be dropped from the late-night time period and that the program would be replaced by a new series, ABC's Nightlife, using a rotating group of guest hosts.

The Les Crane Show ended on February 26, 1965, and ABC's Nightlife began the following Monday, March 1. Crane returned to ABC's late-night schedule several months later when he became the regular host of Nightlife in June 1965.

== Legacy ==
The Les Crane Show is remembered for its confrontational, issue-oriented approach to late-night television. Crane's use of audience participation, direct questioning and discussions of controversial political and social subjects distinguished the program from the more entertainment-focused format of The Tonight Show Starring Johnny Carson.

Crane later returned to ABC as the host of ABC's Nightlife in 1965.

Folk singer Phil Ochs referred to Crane's show in his satirical political song "Love Me, I'm a Liberal", released on the 1966 album Phil Ochs in Concert. In a verse criticizing liberal attitudes toward the Civil Rights Movement, Ochs asks, "What's the matter, don't they watch Les Crane?"
