= Tony Hendra =

British satirist and author (1941–2021)

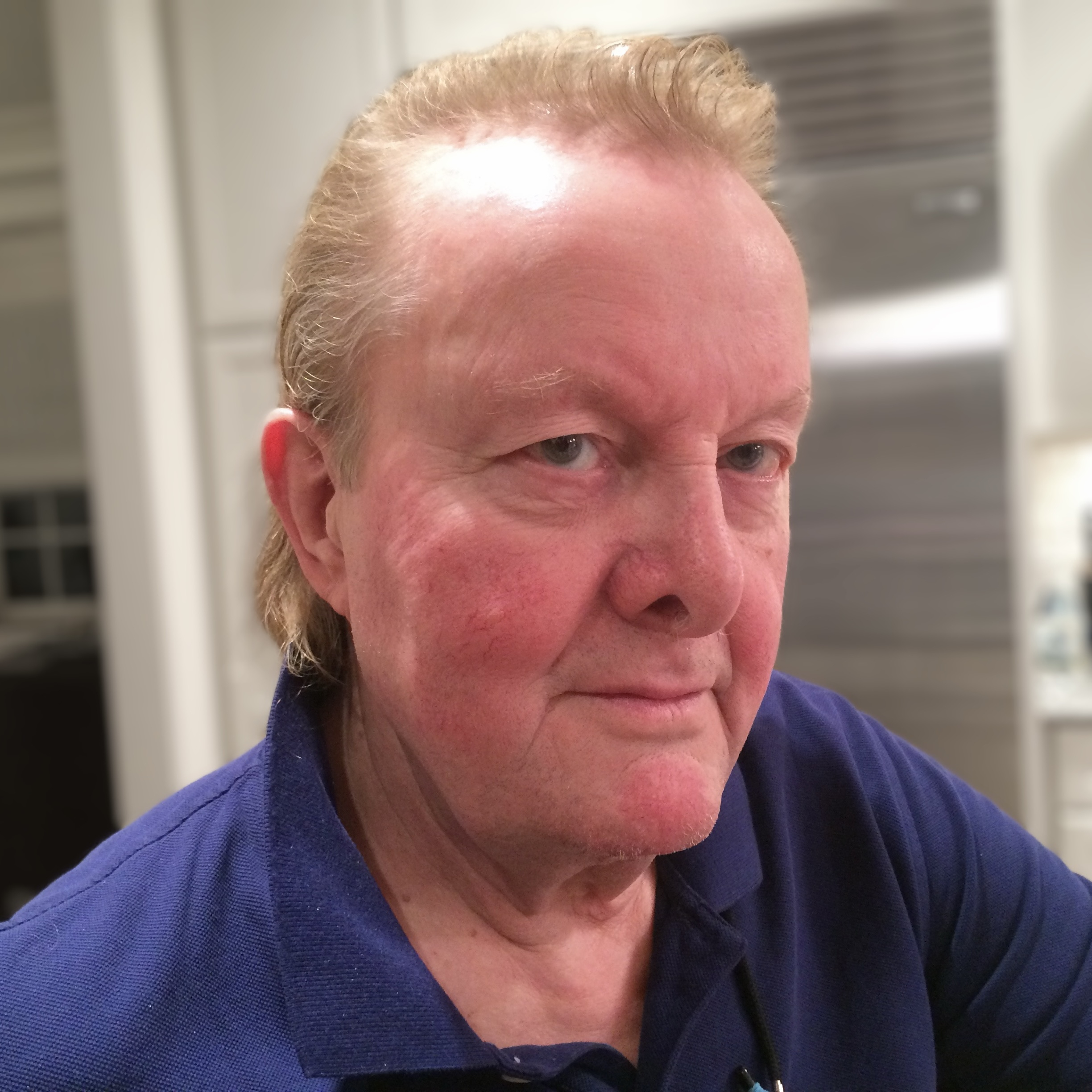
- Hendra in 2015
- Born: Anthony Christopher Hendra; 10 July 1941; Hertfordshire, England, UK
- Died: 4 March 2021 (aged 79); Yonkers, New York, US
- Occupations: Satirist, author
- Spouse(s): Judith H. Christmas (m. 1964; div. 1985) Carla Hendra (m. 1986)
- Children: 5
- Writing career
- Years active: 1961–2018
- Genres: Fiction, non-fiction, satire, social commentary

Anthony Christopher Hendra (10 July 1941 – 4 March 2021) was an English satirist and writer who worked mostly in the United States. He was probably best known for being the head writer and co-producer in 1984 of the first six shows of the long-running British satirical television series Spitting Image and for starring in the film This Is Spinal Tap as the titular band's manager Ian Faith.

== Early life and education ==
Hendra was born in Hertfordshire. His surname is Cornish, and he also had Irish ancestry. Educated at St Albans School (where he was a classmate of Stephen Hawking) and at St John's College, Cambridge, he was a member of the Cambridge University Footlights revue in 1962, alongside John Cleese, Graham Chapman and Tim Brooke-Taylor.

== Comedy performer ==
In 1964, Hendra moved to America, with actor and comedian Nick Ullett. For the next five years they worked successfully as a comedy team, appearing at the Cafe Au Go Go in New York with Lenny Bruce, at the hungry i in San Francisco with Nina Simone and at the Shadows in Washington, DC, with various headliners, including Woody Allen. They were regular guests on The Merv Griffin Show and appeared six times on The Ed Sullivan Show. In 1969 Hendra broke up the comedy team and in 1970 began writing for National Lampoon magazine, from its inception. In 1971 he became the first editor hired by founders Doug Kenney and Henry Beard.

In 1972, Hendra co-created National Lampoon's first album Radio Dinner, with Michael O'Donoghue, on which Hendra performed a parody of John Lennon, titled "Magical Misery Tour". In 1973, Hendra produced, directed and co-wrote (with Sean Kelly) the Lampoon's off-Broadway revue Lemmings, in which Hendra cast John Belushi, Chevy Chase, Rhonda Coullet, Christopher Guest and Alice Playten in their first starring roles. Hendra continued as an editor of the Lampoon until 1975, when he became co-editor-in-chief with Kelly until 1978.

== Freelance editor ==
After leaving the Lampoon in 1978, Hendra began working as a freelance editor, writer and actor. During the New York newspaper strike of 1978, he edited and co-created the parody Not The New York Times with Rusty Unger, Christopher Cerf, and George Plimpton, and published by Larry Durocher and Josh Feigenbaum.

In 1979 he co-edited (with Cerf and actor Peter Elbling) The 80s—A Look Back. In 1980 he packaged and edited The Sayings of Ayatollah Khomeini aka The Little Green Book of Ayatollah Khomeini, a collection of the Ayatollah's actual teachings with an introduction by Clive Irving, which was regularly featured on Johnny Carson's Tonight Show.

In 1982 he was editor-in-chief of Off the Wall Street Journal and Off the Wall Street Journal II, which between them sold almost a million copies and featured such contributors as Kurt Andersen. Other parodies Hendra created and edited included The Irrational Inquirer, Playboy: the Parody and Not the Bible (1983). He was featured on the cover of Newsweek (25 April 1983) with Sean Kelly and Alfred Gingold. Hendra was a writer for and became editor-in-chief of Spy Magazine in the 1990s.

In the mid-1980s, he decided to devote himself exclusively to writing and in 1987 published Going Too Far, a history of "sick," "black," "anti-establishment" American satire from the 1950s to the 1980s, which featured interviews of some of the chief satirists.

== Television and films ==
In 1979, Hendra served as a producer on Disco Beaver from Outer Space, a National Lampoon TV special for HBO. The special incorporated both the main character and story elements from Dragula: Queen of Darkness, a comic story Hendra had written for National Lampoon issue #20 (November 1971) that had been illustrated by Neal Adams.

In 1984, Hendra co-created, co-wrote, and co-produced the British television satirical show Spitting Image, for which he, Jon Blair, and John Lloyd were nominated for a British Academy Award in 1985. He was ousted from the production after the first six shows, being replaced by Rob Grant and Doug Naylor. He played Ian Faith in This Is Spinal Tap.

He appeared in several other films and television programs, including Miami Vice, The Cosby Mysteries, and Law & Order: Criminal Intent. In 1997, Hendra and Ron Shelton were credited as screenwriters on The Great White Hype, a satire of racism in boxing, starring Samuel L. Jackson, Damon Wayans, Jamie Foxx, Jeff Goldblum, and Peter Berg. He co-conceived and wrote the English dubs of three of the films created by Belgian animator Picha, including The Missing Link (1980), The Big Bang (1987), and Snow White: The Sequel (2007).

== Family life and child sexual abuse allegations ==
Hendra was married twice. His first marriage, to Judith Christmas in 1964, produced two daughters and ended in an acrimonious divorce in 1985. He and his second wife, Carla, lived in New York City with their three children.

In 2004, at the time that his memoir Father Joe was achieving best-seller status, Jessica Hendra, the younger of Hendra's two daughters from his first marriage, submitted an op-ed piece to The New York Times in which she asserted that her father failed to include in his narrative of "deliverance through faith and atonement for his failings" that he had sexually abused her as a young child. The newspaper declined to publish the piece but did assign a reporter, N. R. Kleinfield, to investigate her charges.

On 1 July 2004, The New York Times published Kleinfield's story, including details of the alleged acts of molestation and interviews with two of Jessica's therapists, three friends, her mother and her husband. All said that Jessica told them at different times of being molested: in her mother's case, when she was 12. A former boyfriend told Kleinfield, however, that Jessica had never spoken of it during their years together, that she was "very unstable emotionally," and that "I can't believe it happened."

Hendra responded, "I can only just categorically deny this. It's not a new allegation. It's simply not true, I'm afraid." In the wake of criticism of the paper's decision to publish the story in the absence of tangible proof, New York Times ombudsman Daniel Okrent wrote a detailed examination of the procedures followed by the editorial staff prior to publication. While acknowledging that Kleinfield was convinced, based on information gathered during his reporting, that Jessica Hendra had indeed been molested, Okrent expressed concern over possible consequences should the charges prove to be false:

Even if the preponderant evidence indicates it's true ... doesn't the small chance that it's false outweigh the value of giving readers access to the private miseries of the Hendra family? Either way, Tony Hendra will bear the scars of this article forever. People who did not write a book claiming spiritual salvation will suffer as well: his three young children from his second marriage, for instance. In the face of this risk, what do readers of The Times (or of Father Joe) gain by believing Hendra guilty of abuse? There's a difference between the right to know and the need to know, and in this case, the need escapes me ... I don't mean in any way to diminish the gravity of Jessica Hendra's charges ... I can't imagine an accusation more serious, a transgression more detestable. If her story is true, Tony Hendra deserves punishment far greater than humiliation in the pages of The Times. As an editor, the verities of the profession might have led me to publish this article. But as a reader, I wish The Times hadn't.

In 2005, Jessica Hendra wrote a memoir with USA Today journalist Blake Morrison, How to Cook Your Daughter, in which she repeated her accusations.

== Death ==
Hendra died of amyotrophic lateral sclerosis, also known as ALS, on 4 March 2021.

== Books ==
- The 80s: A Look Back at the Tumultuous Decade 1980–1989 (1979) co-edited with Christopher Cerf and Peter Elbling
- Not The Bible (1983) with Sean Kelly
- Going Too Far: the Rise and Demise of Sick, Gross, Black, Sophomoric, Weirdo, Pinko, Anarchist, Underground, Anti-establishment Humor 1955–1980 (1987)
- The 90s: A Look Back (1989) co-edited with Peter Elbling, designed by Paula Scher
- Tales from the Crib (1991) with Bob Saget
- Born to Run Things: An Utterly Unauthorized Biography of George Bush (1992)
- Brad '61: Portrait of the Artist as a Young Man (1993) with Roy Lichtenstein
- The Book of Bad Virtues (1994)
- The GIGAWIT Dictionary of the English Language (2000)
- Brotherhood: A Photographic Tribute to the NYFD Heroes of 9/11 (2001)
- Father Joe: The Man Who Saved My Soul (2004)
- "Dragula: Queen of Darkness" with Neal Adams
- The Messiah of Morris Avenue (2006)
- Last Words (2009) with George Carlin
