= Peter Doggett =

English music journalist

- Born: 30 June 1957 (age 69)
- Occupations: Music journalist; author; magazine editor
- Writing career
- Pen name: Peter Doggett; Rufus Lodge
- Period: 1980–present
- Notable work: You Never Give Me Your Money: The Battle for the Soul of The Beatles
- Website: peterdoggett.org

Peter Doggett (born 30 June 1957) is an English music journalist, author and magazine editor. He began his career in music journalism in 1980, when he joined the London-based magazine Record Collector. He subsequently served as the editor there from 1982 to 1999, after which he continued in the role of managing editor. He has also contributed regularly to magazines such as Mojo, Q and GQ.

Doggett has written extensively about the music and legacy of the Beatles. In the 2001 edition of Barry Miles' The Beatles Diary, he supplied commentary on each of the band's official releases (later compiled in his and Patrick Humphries' 2010 book The Beatles: The Music and the Myth). In 2003, he was part of a team of specialist writers and critics – along with Mark Lewisohn, Ian MacDonald, John Harris, David Fricke, Miles and others – who authored the three-part Mojo: Special Limited Edition series on the Beatles.

In 2009, his book You Never Give Me Your Money: The Battle for the Soul of The Beatles was published in the UK by The Bodley Head. The Los Angeles Times described it as "remarkable" and included the work in its list of the ten best books of the year. According to Beatles historian Erin Torkelson Weber, You Never Give Me Your Money is "one of the most influential books in all Beatles historiography".

Among Doggett's other titles, Are You Ready for the Country (2000) documents the advent of the country rock genre. His book on rock music's role in 1960s countercultural ideology, There's a Riot Going On, was published by Canongate in 2007 and was voted "Best Book of the Year" by Mojo's readers. His more recent books include The Man Who Sold the World: David Bowie and the 1970s (2011) and Electric Shock: From the Gramophone to the iPhone: 125 Years of Pop Music (2015). Doggett's book on John Lennon's later years at the Dakota building in New York, titled Prisoner of Love: Inside the Dakota with John Lennon, was due to be published in April 2021 by independent publisher Jawbone Press. To the confusion of the Beatles and Lennon fan community, the book was cancelled shortly before its publication date.

Doggett also works as a consultant for auctioneers of music memorabilia, specialising in the authentication of manuscripts and recordings. He has written CD liner notes and otherwise assisted in reissue campaigns of works by the Kinks, the Hollies and Tom Jones.

In the 2010 UK General Election, he stood as the Green Party's candidate for the seat of Fareham in Hampshire, the same town in which he grew up. He lives in London with his partner Rachel Baylis, an artist. The couple have two daughters, Catrin and Becca Mascall.

== Published works ==
- Lou Reed: Growing Up in Public (Omnibus Press, 1995)
- Classic Rock Albums: Abbey Road / Let It Be: The Beatles (Schirmer, 1998)
- Are You Ready for the Country: Elvis, Dylan, Parsons and the Roots of Country Rock (Penguin, 2000)
- (with Sarah Hodgson) Christie's Rock & Pop Memorabilia (Billboard Books, 2003)
- The Art and Music of John Lennon (Omnibus Press, 2005)
- There's a Riot Going On: Revolutionaries, Rock Stars, and the Rise and Fall of '60s Counter-Culture (Canongate, 2007)
- You Never Give Me Your Money: The Battle for the Soul of The Beatles (The Bodley Head, 2009)
- (with Patrick Humphries) The Beatles: The Music and the Myth (Omnibus Press, 2010)
- The Man Who Sold the World: David Bowie and the 1970s (The Bodley Head, 2011)
- (as Rufus Lodge) F**k: An Irreverent History of the F-Word (The Friday Project, 2013)
- Electric Shock: From the Gramophone to the iPhone: 125 Years of Pop Music (The Bodley Head, 2015)
