= Les Crane =

Radio announcer and television talk show host (1933–2008)

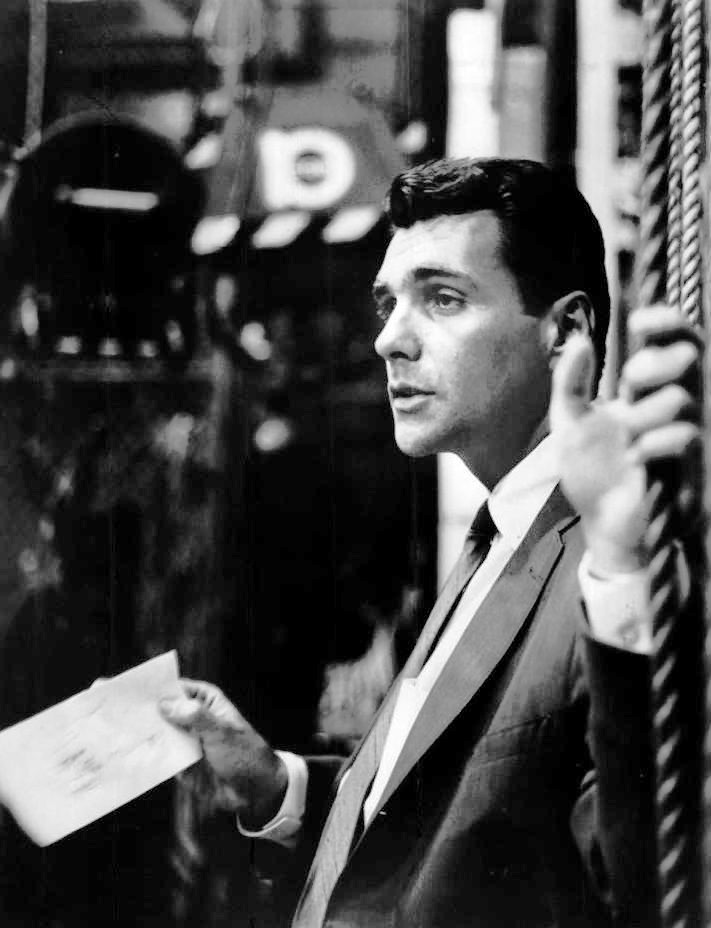
- Crane on the set of his television talk show, 1964
- Born: Lesley Gary Stein; December 3, 1933; New York City, U.S.
- Died: July 13, 2008 (aged 74); Greenbrae, California, U.S.
- Education: Tulane University
- Known for: Television host
- Spouses: Five marriages, including: Tina Louise (m. 1966; div. 1971); Ginger Crane (m. 1988)
- Children: Caprice Crane

Les Crane (born Lesley Gary Stein; December 3, 1933 – July 13, 2008) was an American radio announcer, television host, and actor. A pioneer in interactive broadcasting, he is also known for his 1971 spoken-word recording of the poem Desiderata; he won a "Best Spoken Word" Grammy for it the following year. As host of The Les Crane Show from 1964 to 1965, Crane was the first network television personality to compete head-on with host Johnny Carson after Carson became a fixture of late-night television.

== Biography ==
=== Early life ===
Born in New York, Crane graduated from Tulane University, where he was an English major. He spent four years in the United States Air Force, as a pilot and helicopter flight instructor.

=== Radio ===
He began his radio career in 1958 at KONO in San Antonio and later worked at WPEN (now WKDN) in Philadelphia. In 1961, he became a popular and controversial host for the radio powerhouse KGO in San Francisco. With KGO's strong nighttime 50,000 watt signal reaching as far north as Vancouver, BC, and as far south as Los Angeles, he attracted a regional audience in the West. Variety described him as "the popular, confrontational and sometimes controversial host of San Francisco's KGO. Helping to pioneer talk radio, he was outspoken and outraged some callers by hanging up on them."

A late-night program airing weekdays from 11pm to 2am, Crane at the Hungry I (1962–63) found Crane interacting with owner and impresario Enrico Banducci and interviewing such talents as Barbra Streisand and Professor Irwin Corey.

Crane, along with KRLA general manager John Barrett, were the original people "responsible for creating the Top 40 (list of the most requested pop songs)," said Casey Kasem in a 1990 interview.

=== Television ===
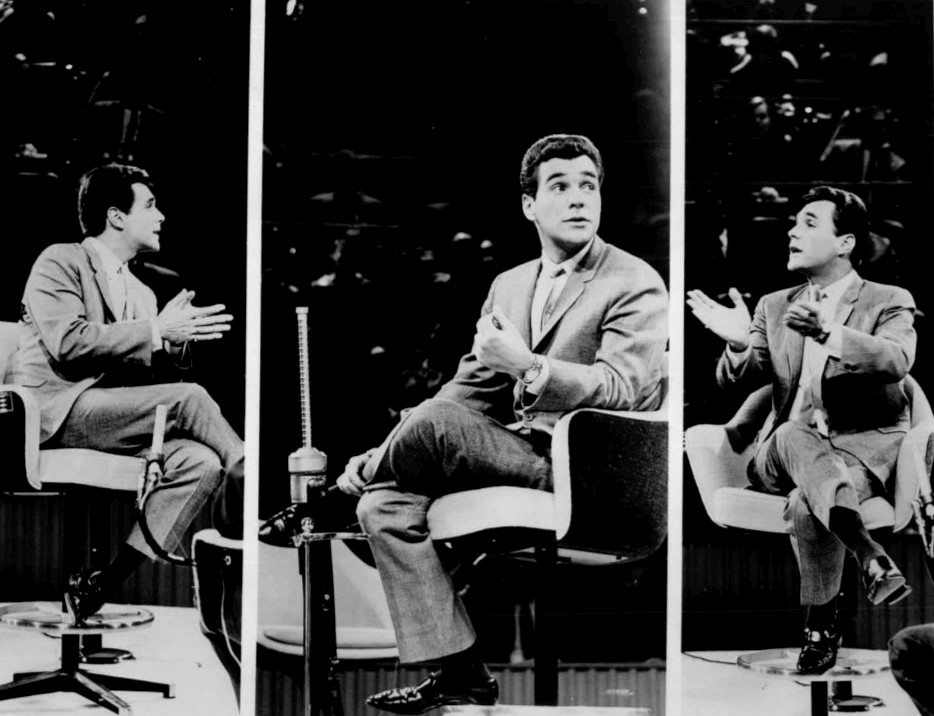
Scenes from Crane's television talk show in 1964.

In 1963, Crane moved to New York City to host Night Line, a 1:00 a.m. talk show on WABC-TV, the American Broadcasting Company's flagship station. The first American TV appearance of The Rolling Stones was on Crane's program in June 1964 when only New Yorkers could see it. At some point in 1963 or 1964, WABC executives changed the title from Night Line to The Les Crane Show. Throughout its run as a local show, viewer phone calls were included. This was possible because of a ten-second broadcast delay that previously had been used by New York radio stations.

The New Les Crane Show debuted nationwide with a trial run (telecast nightly for a week) in August 1964 starting at 11:20 p.m. in east coast cities on the ABC schedule. In other time zones, the start time varied. It originated in one of the network's television studios on Manhattan's West 66th Street. The nationwide scope of the network show made incoming phone calls from viewers impossible with the technology that existed then. Network officials decided that each episode would be videotaped in advance, not live or almost-live as Crane's local show had been. The length of the delay with videotape is unknown decades later because research was not done when first-hand sources were alive. The New Les Crane Show was the first network program to compete with The Tonight Show Starring Johnny Carson, which originated in New York prior to 1972, also with a videotaped delay before each telecast.

ABC network officials used videotapes of two episodes from the August 1964 trial run to pitch The New Les Crane Show to affiliates that had not yet signed up to carry the program. One episode featured the mother of Lee Harvey Oswald debating Oswald's guilt with noted attorney Melvin Belli, Crane and audience members. The other featured Norman Mailer and Richard Burton. Burton encouraged Crane to recite the "gravedigger speech" from Hamlet, and Crane did. Crane had learned to perform it during his time at Tulane University.

More affiliates signed up for a November relaunch of The New Les Crane Show, and Look ran a prominent feature story with captioned still photographs from the August episodes. One image shows Shelley Winters debating a controversial issue with Jackie Robinson, May Craig and William F. Buckley. A video clip from this telecast, preserved at the UCLA Film & Television Archive, indicates that the issue had to do with presidential candidate Barry Goldwater.

While some critics found Crane's late-night series innovative (indeed, two and a half years later The Phil Donahue Show followed a similar format to much greater success on a local station in Dayton, Ohio during its daytime schedule), his series never gained much of an audience.

The two videotapes that ABC used to pitch The New Les Crane Show to its affiliates in 1964 constitute most of the surviving video and audio of Crane's show. The UCLA Film & Television Archive has a digitized collection of clips from the Les Crane Show early episodes in August 1964. It was assembled using videotape editing equipment, difficult to use at the time, probably so network executives could use the collection of clips, in addition to the two entire episodes, to pitch the show to affiliates around the United States that had not yet signed up to carry the show.

An archive of source material on Malcolm X has only the audio of the civil rights leader's appearance with Crane on the night of December 28–29, 1964. Their conversation starts with Crane saying, "This interview is going to be a little difficult for me to do because I know Malcolm. We've done shows together before. He's been a guest of mine on a couple of different occasions. We've had telephone conversations of length and interest." Details of their previous encounters and phone conversations are unknown. In addition to the Malcolm X archive, a business called Archival Television Audio has this recording. It also has sound recordings of Crane's local New York television show from 1963 and 1964 that amplified phone calls from viewers, possibly including Malcolm. (ABC network employees discontinued the phone calls because the limitations of telephone technology ruled out incoming calls from viewers nationwide.)

Audio of Bob Dylan's February 17, 1965 appearance is circulated online, and transcribed. Videotape of that broadcast was erased but still photographs and a snippet in silent 8mm film survive. At least two YouTube uploads include the best possible reconstruction of the telecast.

The National Archives has a transcript of the August 1964 Oswald/Belli episode in its documents related to the JFK assassination that were declassified and released publicly in 1993 and 1994. Crane's daughter Caprice Crane has said she believes her father saved until he died a kinescope of this entire episode.

The collection culled from various episodes (preserved digitally at UCLA Film & Television Archive) includes a short clip from the episode with Shelley Winters, Jackie Robinson, May Craig and William F. Buckley. All except Craig got a lot of airtime voicing opinions of presidential candidate Barry Goldwater. A transcript of this episode does not exist. The UCLA collection excludes Malcolm X, evidently because the collection has only clips from August 1964, and he appeared in December 1964.

Crane aimed a "shotgun microphone" at studio audiences to allow home viewers to see and hear non-famous people participate in controversial discussions with notable people. This plus Crane's interview technique earned him the name "the bad boy of late-night television." The profile in the Look magazine edition of November 3, 1964 called him "television's new bad boy," but critical opinion was divided. The New York Times' media critic Paul Gardner considered him an incisive interviewer who asked tough questions without being insulting. One critic who did not like his show found Crane's trademark shotgun microphone distracting. "Each time he points this mike into the audience, it looks as though he's about to shoot a spectator." Nearly every critic described Crane as photogenic. One described him as "a tall, handsome, and personable lad...."

In addition to Dylan, who rarely appeared on American television, Malcolm X and Richard Burton, Crane's guests on The New Les Crane Show included Martin Luther King Jr., Sam Levene, George Wallace, Robert F. Kennedy, the voice of radio's The Shadow, Bret Morrison (air dates and other episode details unknown for these five guests), Ayn Rand (night of December 15–16, 1964) and Judy Collins (same night as Rand, separate segment).

Crane was unable to dent Johnny Carson's ratings, and his show lasted 14 weeks before ABC executives canceled it and then made Crane one of several hosts of the more show-business-oriented ABC's Nightlife. Late-night viewers did not see him for four months, while ABC's Nightlife featured other hosts. During that period, prime-time viewers saw him as an actor in a guest-star appearance on Burke's Law, also on ABC. It was filmed in Los Angeles. Crane returned to New York for the videotaping of his first ABC's Nightlife appearance, telecast on the night of June 28–29, 1965. Muhammad Ali appeared with Crane and his co-hosts that night.

With ABC's Nightlife, network officials continued to use videotape to delay the telecasts. Possibly alarmed by Ali's statements on the first telecast hosted by Crane, they proceeded to remove most of the controversy and emphasized light entertainment. Producer Nick Vanoff started forbidding guests from broaching controversial topics. After the summer 1965 run ended, network executives relocated the show from New York to Los Angeles, and the fall season began there. The Paley Center for Media has available for viewing the first 15 minutes of an episode from shortly before executives finally cancelled ABC's Nightlife, which happened in early November 1965. Crane can be seen and heard delivering his monologue, joking about words that could be censored (he mouthed them silently or technicians silenced them) and bantering with co-host Nipsey Russell.

Soon after the November 1965 cancellation of ABC's Nightlife, Crane returned to the acting he had started with Burke's Law, but his career was brief. He appeared in the unsuccessful film An American Dream (1966), which was based on the Norman Mailer novel, and made a few guest-star appearances on network television shows, including a 1966 appearance on the western series The Virginian.

Folksinger Phil Ochs mentioned Crane in the lyrics of his satirical 1966 song "Love Me, I'm a Liberal".

Some sources say erroneously that Crane gave the rock group The Mamas and the Papas their name. This is disputed in other sources, including John Phillips' 1986 memoir, which says he and Cass Elliot (both founding members of the group) came up with the name while they were watching a television broadcast about the Hells Angels. Possibly the telecast was one of the ABC's Nightlife segments that Crane filmed far away from his studio. He sometimes filmed interviews on location when guests were unsuitable for a network television studio. In a radio interview, year unknown, that Cass Elliot did after the 1968 disbanding of the group of four singers, she says the following: "We were watching this special on the Hells Angels and one of the guys, Les Crane or somebody, asked them, uh, 'What do you call your women?' And this guy said, 'Well, some call 'em cheap but we call 'em mamas.' And it became a gag. You know, well, if the mamas would cook the dinner, the papas would go out and get the cat food. And it became the Mamas and the Papas." The last several episodes of ABC's Nightlife coincide with the time frame when Phillips, Elliot, their two fellow singers and Lou Adler had daily studio sessions in United Western Recorders in Los Angeles and needed a name for their group. Crane's interview with the Hells Angels, if it happened as Elliot suggested, does not survive.

Les Crane was known as an advocate for civil rights, and was praised by black journalists for his respectful interviews with such black newsmakers as Martin Luther King Jr. (details unknown), Malcolm X and Muhammad Ali.

Crane was one of the first interviewers to have an openly gay guest, Randy Wicker, on his television show. This occurred late on the night of January 31-February 1, 1964, when Crane's show that was titled Night Line aired locally on WABC Channel 7 in New York City. Archival Television Audio has 38 minutes of the sound of this telecast. Viewer phone calls included one from a woman who told Wicker and other men who appeared on-camera with him that she had a male relative whom she knew was a homosexual. Several months later, members of a lesbian advocacy group, the Daughters of Bilitis, tried to appear on Crane's show but were less fortunate than the groundbreaking men, as The New York Times reported.

A panel discussion of lesbianism that was to have been presented Friday night [June 19, 1964] on the Les Crane television show on WABC-TV was ordered canceled by the station's legal department. A spokesman for the show said that no reason had been given.

After Les Crane's final network television appearance in 1969, he refused to discuss his television career and did not respond to queries about any kinescope films of his late-night ABC show from 1964 that he possibly owned.

His daughter Caprice Crane has said he had two August 1964 episodes in their entirety: the one with Richard Burton that is represented by a large still photograph of Burton and Crane in Crane's Look magazine profile (Norman Mailer supposedly appears on the episode, too), and the one in which Melvin Belli debates Lee Oswald's guilt with Lee's mother Marguerite.

When Caprice was informed about the reel of clips from a handful of episodes that can be viewed at the UCLA Film and Television Archive, she replied that she had never seen it and she did not know whether her father was ever aware of it.

=== Later career ===
Crane had another acting part in 1967, starring as Jack, the leader of three detectives in I Love a Mystery, a pilot film for a proposed television series based on the popular radio show that had aired from 1939 to 1944. His colleagues were portrayed by Hagan Beggs and David Hartman. The series wasn't developed, and NBC aired the film in 1968. Crane made guest appearances on three episodes of the police drama Ironside. The first, chronologically, was titled "Force of Arms," which NBC telecast on January 4, 1968. He played himself, a newscaster.

In 1968, Les Crane was hosting a radio talk show on KLAC in Los Angeles. Critics noted that in the style of the late 1960s, he now dressed in a turtleneck and moccasins, sprinkling his speech with words like "groovy." However, he was still doing interviews with major newsmakers and discussing topics like civil disobedience, hippies and the rising popularity of meditation. Crane left KLAC when the station switched to a country music format.

For approximately nine months during 1968, Crane had two jobs: his KLAC radio show and a syndicated television talk show that originated from independent station KTTV channel 11 in Los Angeles. Outlets for this syndicated series included WTTG Channel 5 in Washington, DC, according to multiple television schedule listings in The Washington Post and The Washington Star when it was known as the Evening Star. YouTube has one entire telecast from this series, running time 48 minutes 25 seconds, with the YouTube title "The Les Crane Show August/Sept 1968." It consists of Crane and two guests, Joseph Lewis and Jack Lindsey, discussing the policies of California governor Ronald Reagan. As the episode exists in its entirety, it establishes that producers and syndication company executives did not include studio audience members in Crane's conversations with his guests. In the 1960s, syndicated talk shows aired several days, or as much as a few weeks, after they were videotaped, and the broadcast date varied with each local television station, so those situations ruled out viewer phone calls. Why the syndication company bailed out of Crane's show in 1968 was not reported by newspapers or trade papers for the broadcasting industry.

In late 1971, the 45 RPM single (music) of Crane's reading of the poem Desiderata reached number 8 on the Billboard charts. It became what one writer called "a New Age anthem." Crane's spoken word album that included the "Desiderata" track won him a Grammy for Best Spoken Word Album.

Though Crane thought the poem was in the public domain when it was recorded, the rights belonged to the family of author Max Ehrmann, and royalties were distributed accordingly. When asked about the recording during an interview by the Los Angeles Times in 1987, Crane replied, "I can't listen to it now without gagging."

There is no evidence that Crane possibly appeared on television to perform "Desiderata." The network telecast of the Grammy Awards ceremony in 1972 skipped the category of Best Spoken Word Album, according to Kelsey Goelz, a curator at the Grammy Museum at L.A. Live. She said in 2023: "I heard back from the Director of Media Production and he confirmed that the award for Best Spoken Word Recording did not make the telecast in 1972. Unfortunately the pre-telecast ceremonies were not recorded back then, so there is no record of who presented to Les Crane and what was said."

In the 1980s, Crane transitioned to the software industry, joining The Software Toolworks as chairman and partner. Toolworks created the three-dimensional color chess series Chessmaster 2000 and the educational series Mavis Beacon Teaches Typing, making Crane a multimillionaire. The company was sold and renamed Mindscape in the early 1990s.

== Marriages ==
Crane was married five times. A 1964 Look magazine profile of Crane included a photograph of him with his second wife, Eve (née Ford). The article noted that Crane was helping raise the younger two of her three children from her previous marriage, which had ended in divorce. Her oldest child was at boarding school in Oregon. Look photographer Bob Sandberg captured the two younger children watching their mother and Crane play a game of Go on the lawn of their home in Oyster Bay, Long Island.

According to Los Angeles Times entertainment columnist Hal Humphrey, the marriage of Crane and Eve Ford Crane, and his relationships with her three children, fell apart immediately after the February 1965 decision by network executives to cancel The New Les Crane Show and to dismiss him.

The following month, Crane traveled to Los Angeles to film his guest cameo appearance on the TV series Burke's Law. He appears in one scene of an episode titled "Who Killed the Card?" that was telecast on May 5, 1965.

On March 20, 1965, during Crane's visit to a Los Angeles discothèque called the Daisy Club, he met actress Tina Louise for the first time when screenwriter and television writer Paddy Chayefsky introduced her. She described their meeting to the columnist Humphrey and to veteran Associated Press journalist Bob Thomas. This was during her first season with Gilligan's Island. Although Crane's stay in Los Angeles was brief, a long-distance relationship developed between him and Louise. She provided Thomas with details of how they maintained contact while their respective television shows kept them working on opposite coasts. Nightlife had taken him to New York City for the summer of 1965, and both had only weekends for airline travel and no vacation time.

Les Crane and Eve Ford Crane divorced in 1965 prior to his interview with Humphrey. In 1966, Crane married Louise. Their only child together, Caprice Crane, was born in 1970; she became an author, screenwriter and television producer.

Crane and Louise acted together in a 1969 segment of the television comedy Love, American Style titled "Love and the Advice-Givers." By then, television viewers had not seen Crane hosting a talk show for a year, and did not see him again in any genre of a television show. He and Louise divorced in 1971 during the peak of his success with Desiderata, his spoken word album.

== Death ==
Crane died on July 13, 2008, in Greenbrae, California, north of San Francisco, at age 74. At the time of his death, he had been living in nearby Belvedere with his wife Ginger.
