= Max Ehrmann =

American writer, poet, and attorney (1872–1945)

- Born: September 26, 1872; Terre Haute, Indiana, U.S.
- Died: September 9, 1945 (aged 72); Terre Haute, Indiana, U.S.
- Resting place: Highland Lawn Cemetery, Terre Haute, Indiana; 39.476398°N 87.347801°W
- Education: DePauw University; Harvard University
- Occupations: Attorney, businessman
- Known for: Prose poem "Desiderata" (1927)
- Spouse: Bertha Pratt King Ehrmann

Max Ehrmann (September 26, 1872 – September 9, 1945) was an American writer, poet, and attorney from Terre Haute, Indiana, widely known for his 1927 prose poem "Desiderata" (Latin: "things desired"). He often wrote on spiritual themes.

== Education ==
Ehrmann was of German descent; both his parents emigrated from Bavaria to the United States in the 1840s. Young Ehrmann was educated at the Terre Haute Fourth District School and the German Methodist Church.

He received a degree in English from DePauw University in Greencastle, Indiana, which he attended from 1890 to 1894. While there, he was a member of Delta Tau Delta's Beta Beta chapter and was editor of the school newspaper, Depauw Weekly.

Ehrmann then studied philosophy and law at Harvard University, where he was editor of Delta Tau Delta's national magazine The Rainbow, circa 1896.

== Professional life ==
Ehrmann returned to his hometown of Terre Haute, Indiana, in 1898 to practice law. He was a deputy state's attorney in Vigo County, Indiana, for two years. Subsequently, he worked in his family's meatpacking business and in the overalls manufacturing industry (Ehrmann Manufacturing Co.) At age 40, Ehrmann left the business to write. At age 55, he wrote Desiderata, which achieved fame only after his death.

== Legacy ==
Ehrmann was awarded Doctor of Letters honorary degree from DePauw University in about 1937. He was also elected to the Delta Tau Delta Distinguished Service Chapter, the fraternity's highest alumni award.

Ehrmann died in 1945 and is buried in Highland Lawn Cemetery in Terre Haute, Indiana.

In 2010 the city honored Ehrmann with a life-size bronze statue by sculptor Bill Wolfe. He is depicted sitting on a downtown bench, pen in hand, with a notebook in his lap. "Desiderata" is engraved on a plaque next to the statue and lines from the poem are embedded in the walkway. The sculpture is in the collection of Art Spaces, Inc. – Wabash Valley Outdoor Sculpture Collection. Art Spaces also holds an annual Max Ehrmann Poetry Competition.

== Bibliography ==
- Max Ehrmann (1898). A Farrago Cooperative publishing co. Cambridge Mass
- Max Ehrmann (1900). The Mystery of Madeline le Blanc Cooperative publishing co. Cambridge Mass
- Max Ehrmann (1901). A Fearsome Riddle Bowen-Merrill Co., Indianapolis
- Max Ehrmann (1904). Breaking Home Ties Dodge Publishing Co. New York
- Max Ehrmann (1906). A Prayer and Selections New York
- Max Ehrmann (1906). Max Ehrmann's Poems Viquesney Publishing Co
- Max Ehrmann (1907). Who Entereth Here Dodge Publishing Co.
- Max Ehrmann (1910). The Poems of Max Ehrmann Dodge Publishing Co. New York
- Max Ehrmann (1911). The Wife of Marobius and Other Plays Mitchell Kennerley, New York
- Max Ehrmann (1912). Fort Harrison on the Banks of the Wabash, 1812–1912 (contributor) by Fort Harrison Centennial Association
- Max Ehrmann (1912). Eugene V. Debs, what his neighbors and others say of Him (contributor) Edited by James H. Hollingsworth
- Max Ehrmann (1915). Jesus: A Passion Play Baker & Taylor Co. New York
- Max Ehrmann (1915). In Memoriam Elbert and Alice Hubbard (contributor) Ed. Elbert Hubbard Jr., The Roycrofters, East Aurora, Erie County, New York
- Max Ehrmann (1916). An Invitation to You and your Folks from Jim and Some of the Home Folk (contributor) Compiled by George Ade, Bobbs-Merrill Co.
- Max Ehrmann (1917). David and Bathsheba The Drama vol. 7 Edited by Vandervort Sloan
- Max Ehrmann (1922). A Virgin's Dream and Other Verses of Scarlet Women Henry J Fuller
- Max Ehrmann (1922). The Bank Robbery in A Book of One Act Plays edited by Barbara Louise Schafter
- Max Ehrmann (1924). Paul Dresser: Composer of 'On the Banks of the Wabash' A Sketch Paul Dresser Memorial Assoc. Terre Haute
- Max Ehrmann (1925). The Gay Life Indiana Publishing Co. Terre Haute (Scarlet woman series)
- Max Ehrmann (1925). A Goose with a Rose in Her Mouth Indiana Publishing Co. Terre Haute (Scarlet woman series)
- Max Ehrmann (1925). His Beautiful Wife and Other Stories Indiana Publishing Co. Terre Haute (Scarlet woman series)
- Max Ehrmann (1925). Scarlet Sketches Indiana Publishing Co. Terre Haute (Scarlet woman series)
- Max Ehrmann (1925). Be Quiet, I'm Talking, Being Conversations ed. Edna Smith, Indiana Publishing Co. Terre Haute (Scarlet woman series)
- Max Ehrmann (1926). Love From Many Angles Haldeman-Julius Co., Girard, Kansas (Little Blue Book No. 1113)
- Max Ehrmann (1927). Book of Farces: The Bank Robbery; The Plumber Indiana Publishing Co. Terre Haute
- Max Ehrmann (1934). Worldly Wisdom: Being the Wisdom of Jesus Sirach Girard, Kansas: Haldeman-Julius Company (Little Blue Book No. 1735)
- Max Ehrmann (before 1938). The Plumber
- Bertha Pratt King Ehrmann (1948). The Poems of Max Ehrmann (includes Desiderata) Bruce Humphries Inc. Boston
- Bertha Pratt King Ehrmann (1951). Max Ehrmann: A Poet's Life Bruce Humphries Inc. Boston
- Bertha Pratt King Ehrmann (1952). The Journal of Max Ehrmann Bruce Humphries Inc. Boston
- Max Ehrmann (1972). Desiderata illustrated by Emil Antonocci, Brooke House, New York, distributed by Crown Publishers Inc.
