= List of Milton Academy alumni =

This list of alumni of Milton Academy includes graduates and students who did not graduate.

- Cleveland Amory, author, animal rights activist
- John Avlon '91, author and The Daily Beast editor-in-chief
- Edward Larrabee Barnes, architect
- Victoria Barr, painter
- Betsy Beers '75, executive producer of Grey's Anatomy
- Matty Beniers '21, hockey player
- Franklin S. Billings, Jr., chief justice of Vermont Supreme Court
- Stephen Humphrey Bogart '67, writer and producer
- Lewis E. Braverman, endocrinologist
- H. Adams Carter '32, editor and explorer
- Lucien B. Caswell, lawyer and politician
- Ian Cheney '98, filmmaker
- Tze Chun '98, painter, writer, and film director
- Carson Cistulli '98, poet and journalist
- Linwood Clark 1899, U.S. representative
- Dennis Clifford '11, basketball player
- Bertha Coombs '80, general assignment reporter for CNBC
- Clifton Truman Daniel, writer, newspaper editor, and grandson of President Harry S Truman
- Nick DiGiovanni, chef
- Annie Dorsen '91, playwright and director
- Ann Douglas, Columbia University intellectual historian
- T. S. Eliot 1906, poet and playwright
- Esther E. Freeman '97, dermatologist
- Buckminster Fuller (1913), author, scientific theorist, and inventor
- Aaron Goldberg '91, pianist
- Austan Goolsbee '87, economist
- Frances Hamerstrom, writer and naturalist
- Nancy Harkness Love, pilot and commander
- Josh Hennessy '03, former professional hockey player
- Jake Hooker '91, reporter
- Jidenna, singer/songwriter and record producer
- Charles C. Johnson '07, conservative journalist
- Edward Johnson, III, businessman and investor
- Josh Karp, journalist and author
- Patrick Radden Keefe '94, writer
- Robert F. Kennedy '44, former U.S. attorney general and U.S. senator from New York, member of Kennedy political family
- Ted Kennedy '50, U.S. senator
- Alexandra Kerry '92, film producer and daughter of U.S. Senator John Kerry of Massachusetts
- Grace Knowlton, artist
- Reif Larsen '98, author
- Beverly Leon '10, former midfielder for Sunderland A.F.C. Ladies and entrepreneur
- David Lindsay-Abaire '88, playwright
- William Lobkowicz, brewer and real estate restoration expert
- Douglas MacArthur II, diplomat
- Hanford MacNider, diplomat
- Seth Magaziner '02, RI general treasurer
- Heather McGhee '97, political commentator and strategist
- Henry Plumer McIlhenny - art collector and curator of the Philadelphia Museum of Art
- Marty McInnis '88, hockey player
- Claire Messud, author
- Lisa Miller, professor of spirituality in psychology
- Peter B. Moore, molecular ribosome expert
- Kalel Mullings '20, NFL running back for the Tennessee Titans
- Galt Niederhoffer 93, producer, director and novelist
- Jehane Noujaim '92, Egyptian-American director of Academy Award-nominated documentary film The Square
- Rob O'Gara '12, former professional hockey player
- Farah Pandith '86, special representative to Muslim Communities for United States Department of State
- Deval Patrick '74, 2007–2015 governor of Massachusetts
- James H. Perkins, former chairman of Citigroup
- Richard C. Perry '73, investor
- Ashley Phillips '04, soccer player and Northeastern University head coach
- Matthew Pottinger '91, United States Marine Corps officer
- J. B. Pritzker, governor of Illinois and businessman, member of the Pritzker family
- Andrew Rappleyea '23, tight end for the Penn State Nittany Lions
- Elliot Richardson, former U.S. attorney general
- Cormac Ryan '18, college basketball player
- Sarah Schechter, film and television producer
- Rob Sheffield, author
- John Darrell Sherwood, military historian
- Robert E. Sherwood, playwright and screenwriter
- Sherrod E. Skinner, Jr., Medal of Honor recipient
- Jenny Slate, comedian and actress
- Steven C. Swett '52, journalist and publisher, Gerald Loeb Award winner
- Sarah Sze '87, contemporary artist
- James Taylor '66, singer/songwriter and guitarist
- Scofield Thayer, poet and publisher
- Touré '89, novelist, cultural critic
- Tommy Vietor '98, political commentator and podcaster
- William Robert Ware, architect
- Richard B. Wigglesworth, U.S. representative
- Jonathan Wong, singer-songwriter, actor and producer
- Justin Yoon, football player
