= Cheeseface =

Dog featured on magazine cover

Mr. Cheeseface
- Cheeseface on the cover of National Lampoon
- Species: Dog
- Breed: Mongrel
- Sex: Male
- Born: c. 1968 or 1969
- Died: 1976 (aged 7-8); East Charleston, Vermont, U.S.
- Cause of death: Shot by a hunter
- Known for: Appearing on a 1973 cover of National Lampoon magazine
- Owner: Jimmy De Pierro
- Offspring: 8

Cheeseface (c. 1968 or 1969 – 1976) was a mixed-breed dog who featured on the famous "Death" issue of the National Lampoon magazine, released January 1973. The cover, photographed by Ronald G. Harris, showed the dog with a gun pointed to his head, and the caption "If You Don't Buy This Magazine, We'll Kill This Dog".

In early 1976, Cheeseface was shot and killed on the farm where he lived with his owner, Jimmy De Pierro, in East Charleston, Vermont, by a hunter whose name was unreleased.

In 2005, the cover was voted No. 7 in the Top 40 Magazine Covers of the Last 40 Years by the American Society of Magazine Editors.

== Life and career ==
Cheeseface, originally named Chiisai (Japanese for "small"), was adopted as a puppy by Jimmy De Pierro in 1969. In 1972, De Pierro pitched a photo of Cheeseface to All Tame Animals, an animal talent agency. From there, Cheeseface was given the job of modeling for the cover of National Lampoon's "Death" issue.

While shooting the infamous cover, Cheeseface would not cooperate, refusing to look at the gun. According to one account, this was finally achieved when the model holding the gun pulled the trigger, causing Cheeseface to look in the direction of the clicking sound. However, De Pierro claimed that Cheeseface was distracted by a bulldog in the studio, and what finally diverted his attention to the gun was the model brushing his ear with the nose of the gun. Tony Hendra did not want the dog to look straight at the camera, as when doing that, "he simply appeared victimized."

Cheeseface only appeared in one more ad, for Frigidaire. Cheeseface sired a litter of eight puppies in 1975, with the mother being a St. Bernard.

== Death ==
Cheeseface was shot and killed in 1976. Despite rumors that he was tracked down and killed, De Pierro maintained that he was shot by a hunter who had already shot several dogs in the area for chasing and killing deer. Three of Cheeseface's puppies had also been killed in the weeks before, and a fourth was shot but survived.

Shortly after Cheeseface was killed, the National Lampoon received a phone call informing them of the event. Susan Devins, the copyeditor who answered the call, initially thought it was a joke due to the bizarre nature of the crime. According to the book A Futile and Stupid Gesture, upon realizing it was serious, "she burst into tears, thinking, 'Oh my God, what have I gotten myself into?'"

== Legacy ==
Cheeseface's cover has been named one of the best magazine covers of all time by such places as The Guardian and The New York Times. The latter wrote that the comedy of the cover works because Cheeseface is looking in the direction of the gun, rather than at the reader. Tony Hendra said that the cover caused "outrage" when it came out, and that "we certainly couldn't do that cover today without getting shot, or banned forever."

The Cheeseface cover has been referenced in various other National Lampoon related works of media. It appears on the album Buy This Box or We'll Shoot This Dog, and is parodied on the covers of If You Don't Buy This Book, We'll Kill This Dog and A Futile and Stupid Gesture. A fictionalized version of the cover's creation is depicted in the film adaptation of A Futile and Stupid Gesture.

== See also ==
- A Futile and Stupid Gesture (film)
