= A Futile and Stupid Gesture: How Doug Kenney and National Lampoon Changed Comedy Forever =

2006 book by Josh Karp

- First edition
- Author: Josh Karp
- Cover artist: Rick Meyerowitz
- Language: English
- Publisher: Chicago Review Press
- Publication date: 2006
- Publication place: United States
- Media type: Print
- Pages: 416
- ISBN: 978-1556526022

A Futile and Stupid Gesture: How Doug Kenney and National Lampoon Changed Comedy Forever is an American book by Josh Karp that was published in 2006. It is a history of National Lampoon magazine and one of its three founders, Doug Kenney, during the 1970s. The book was based on numerous interviews with people who contributed to the magazine, and people who performed in The National Lampoon Radio Hour, and the stage show Lemmings.

As the book recounts, at that time the National Lampoon's performers included John Belushi, Bill Murray, Chevy Chase and Gilda Radner, all of whom subsequently went on to appear on Saturday Night Live and have careers in other media, including film. Writers and artists included John Hughes, Sean Kelly, Chris Miller, P. J. O'Rourke, Tony Hendra, and Bruce McCall. The book also includes stories about the making of the movies Animal House and Caddyshack. The main title of the book is a quote from Animal House, part of a line spoken by the character Otter.

== Film adaptation ==
A film adaptation, also titled A Futile and Stupid Gesture, was released in 2018. David Wain directed from a script by Michael Colton and John Aboud, with Will Forte playing Doug Kenney and Domhnall Gleeson as Henry Beard.

== See also ==
- National Lampoon: Drunk Stoned Brilliant Dead
