= Close Enough =

American adult animated sitcom

- Genre: Adult animation; Animated sitcom; Black comedy; Science fantasy; Surreal comedy
- Created by: J. G. Quintel
- Developed by: J. G. Quintel; Sean Szeles; Matt Price; Calvin Wong
- Voices of: J. G. Quintel; Gabrielle Walsh; Jason Mantzoukas; Kimiko Glenn; Jessica DiCicco; James Adomian; Danielle Brooks
- Composers: Mark Mothersbaugh; John Enroth; Albert Fox
- Country of origin: United States
- Original language: English
- No. of seasons: 3
- No. of episodes: 24

Production
- Executive producers: J. G. Quintel; John Aboud; Michael Colton; Sean Szeles; Rob Sorcher; Brian A. Miller; Jennifer Pelphrey; Bill Oakley; Sam Register
- Producer: Ryan Slater
- Running time: 22–24 minutes
- Production company: Cartoon Network Studios

Original release
- Network: HBO Max
- Release: July 9, 2020 – April 7, 2022

Related
- Regular Show; Regular Show: The Movie; Regular Show: The Lost Tapes

Close Enough is an American adult animated sitcom created by J. G. Quintel. Originally intended to air on TBS in 2017, the project faced various delays and setbacks before eventually premiering on HBO Max on July 9, 2020. The series has received positive reviews, with critics praising the animation, humor, and voice acting, comparing it favorably to Quintel's previous series, Regular Show, which aired on Cartoon Network from 2010 to 2017.

In July 2022, HBO Max cancelled the series after three seasons, and a month later, the show was removed from the service. The show was available on Netflix internationally until it was removed from the service in May 2023.

== Premise ==
A couple in their early 30s, Josh and Emily, and their young daughter, Candice, live in a Los Angeles duplex with their divorced friends, Alex and Bridgette. They get into what seem like normal domestic crises, which tend to escalate in surreal (often even in science fiction and fantasy-esque) ways.

== Cast and characters ==
=== Main ===
- Joshua "Josh" Singleton (voiced by J. G. Quintel) – an aspiring video game developer who works for Plugger-Inners; a television installation company based on Geek Squad. His appearance and mannerisms are based on those of Quintel. Quintel also voices himself.
- Emily Ramirez (voiced by Gabrielle Walsh) – Josh's wife, who works as an assistant for a food corporation called FoodCorp. Emily and Bridgette play guitar and sing at local cafes hoping to become famous. She is based on Quintel's own wife, Cassia. Walsh also voices herself.
- Candice Singleton-Ramirez (voiced by Jessica DiCicco) – Josh and Emily's five-year old daughter, who can be very hyperactive and struggles with schoolwork. She attends Chamomile Elementary School, after being transferred out of an unnamed elementary school where the children ran wild and killed a bus driver after tipping over his bus. DiCicco also voices herself.
- Alex Dorpenberger (voiced by Jason Mantzoukas) – Josh's Greek-American best friend and Bridgette's ex-husband, who works as a community college professor and a struggling Viking-themed fantasy author. He is a conspiracy theorist. Following the series finale "Match Made in Valhalla", Alex and Bridgette got back together. Mantzoukas also voices himself.
- Bridgette Hashima (voiced by Kimiko Glenn) – Emily's best friend and Alex's ex-wife. She is a Japanese-American social media influencer, and a part-time comedy singer-songwriter in a band with Emily. Her middle name was revealed as "No Stress" in an episode from the first season, which also revealed that it was the result of a legal name change that she authorized while she was under the influence of drugs. Glenn also voices herself.
- Pearle Watson (voiced by Danielle Brooks) – A retired African-American LAPD police officer, and the landlady of the duplex.
- Randall "Randy" Watson (voiced by James Adomian) – Pearle's adopted white son, and the duplex's property manager. He was adopted by Pearle after his biological parents, Wyatt and Deborah Trickle, were arrested for siphoning gas from multiple cars. Randy is revealed to be gay in season 3.

=== Supporting ===
- Mr. Timothy Campbell (voiced by John Early) – Candice's hippie kindergarten teacher at Chamomile Elementary School.
- Mr. Salt (voiced by Fred Stoller) – Emily's boss at FoodCorp.
- Dr. Glandz (voiced by Cheri Oteri) – A physician who works at a hospital called Pretty Good Samaritan.
- Dante (voiced by Eugene Cordero) – One of Josh's coworkers at Plugger-Inners who has a prosthetic lower arm.
- Jojo (voiced by Mo Collins) – A biker woman who is the leader of the Cool Moms, and the mother of Candice's classmate, Mia.
- Trish (voiced by Kate Higgins) – A former member of the Cool Moms and the mother of Candice's best friend and classmate, Maddie.
- Ms. Hashima (voiced by Suzy Nakamura) – Bridgette's mother and a successful businesswoman.

=== Additional voices ===
- William Salyers
- Max Mittelman
- Roger Craig Smith
- Erica Lindbeck
- Fred Tatasciore
- Kevin Michael Richardson
- Matthew Mercer
- Grey Griffin
- Scott Menville
- Ali Hillis
- Eric Bauza
- Kate Micucci
- Marc Evan Jackson
- Sam Marin
- Eden Riegel
- Ashley Johnson
- Courtenay Taylor
- Chris Cox
- Susanne Blakeslee
- Travis Willingham
- Scott Whyte
- Troy Baker
- Lauren Lapkus
- Nancy Linari
- Vanessa Marshall
- Laura Bailey

=== Guest stars ===
- "Weird Al" Yankovic as himself
- David Hasselhoff as himself
- Noel Fielding as Snailathan Gold
- Dave Foley as Dr. Ferguson
- George Lopez as Wurst Bros. leader
- Matt Besser as Bush Guy
- Rachel Dratch as Meredith Breedmore
- Seth Morris as Robot guards/Anders
- Eugene Cordero as Dante
- Jane Lynch as Barb
- Chris Parnell as Ron
- Jessica St. Clair as Joy
- Rich Sommer as Keith Nash
- Brent Weinbach as Lee
- Steve Agee as Davey Wegman
- Judy Greer as Nikki
- Diamond White as Caitlin Olsman/Young Pearle
- Kate Berlant as River Lake
- Paul F. Tompkins as The Amazing Sardini
- Lea DeLaria as Prisoner
- Horatio Sanz as Raoul
- Lennon Parham as Toluca Lake
- James Urbaniak as Commercial Bot
- Whitmer Thomas as The Goosh
- Jordan Black as Pterodactyl
- Skyler Gisondo as Cameron
- Rachel Bloom as Kira
- Michaela Watkins as Brienne Bishop
- Nicole Byer as Ophira
- Heidi Gardner as Becca
- Beck Bennett as Luc
- David Koechner as Wyatt Trickle
- Wendie Malick as Deborah Trickle
- Keith David as "World's Greatest Teacher" mug
- Thomas Lennon as Henri
- Ken Marino as Dave Colider
- Laraine Newman as Frederica
- Monét X Change as Margo
- Anjelika Washington as Rikki
- Leonardo Nam as Ty
- Nikki Glaser as Ranessa
- Henry Winkler as Alex’s Dad
- George Newbern as Sam Snood
- Brian Blessed as Jack Kleghorn
- Andy Daly as Obo
- Keith Szarabajka as Sam "The Sandman" Sanders
- Danny Cooksey as Little Sandy

== Episodes ==
Season	Segments	Episodes	Originally released
1	15	8	July 9, 2020
2	16	8	February 25, 2021
3	15	8	April 7, 2022

=== Season 1 (2020) ===
The first season was originally set to run for 10 episodes, but only 8 episodes were released when the series launched.

No. overall	No. in season	Title	Directed by	Written by	Storyboard directors	Original release date	TBS air date
1	1	"Quilty Pleasures"	Sean Szeles; Randy Myers (animation)	Minty Lewis, Ryan Pequin, and Madeline Queripel; Storyboarded by : Mike Bertino, Kris Wimberly, and J. G. Quintel	Aminder Dhaliwal, Ryan Pequin, Madeline Queripel, and Andres Salaff	July 9, 2020	October 25, 2021
1	1	"The Perfect House"	Sean Szeles and Calvin Wong; Randy Myers (animation)	Minty Lewis; Storyboarded by : Miggs Perez, Kris Wimberly, and Raul Guerra	Aminder Dhaliwal and Andres Salaff	July 9, 2020	October 25, 2021
"Quilty Pleasures": While picking up Candice from school, Josh and Emily learn from her teacher, Mr. Campbell, that she must turn in a family tree quilt project. Forcing Alex and Bridgette to babysit Candice, they travel to the fashion district to collect the materials they need for the quilt, only to end up stuck as the district closes. Josh's wallet is stolen, and he and Emily track the thief to an abandoned factory, where they meet a group of street urchins. Employing their help, Josh and Emily successfully create the quilt and spend the night at the factory. In the morning, Josh and Emily realize that the street urchins are actually dwarfish adults who try to force them to stay and act as their parents, although they escape. Arriving at the school, they discover that Candice has already made her own family quilt, and Mr. Campbell passes her. "The Perfect House": Emily develops a hobby of visiting open houses, bringing her family along with her. After becoming overwhelmed by the mess in the duplex building, she visits another open house by herself, meeting Dave, a stressed-out father, and Mona Arizona, a pre-teen pop star, who are also visiting. They pretend to be a family in order to remain at the open house longer; although Emily soon realizes that they have become trapped in an 80s-style sitcom within the open house. Meanwhile, Josh orders a family bike, and goes looking for Emily when he realizes she has been missing for days. Arriving at the open house, Josh is also trapped in the sitcom, which he and Emily realize can only be escaped by doing something that cannot happen on sitcoms. Emily confesses that she likes being able to escape the chaos at home, and peacefully disowns her sitcom family, allowing her and Josh to leave, although Dave and Mona choose to stay. Josh gives Emily a set of tin containers from the open houses to help her, and together with Candice, Alex and Bridgette they ride on the family bike.
2	2	"Logan's Run'd"	J. G. Quintel and Calvin Wong; Brian Hogan (animation)	Chris Kula	David Davis and Siti Lu	July 9, 2020	November 1, 2021
2	2	"Room Parents"	J. G. Quintel and Calvin Wong; Brian Hogan (animation)	Aaron Burdette	Janice Chun and Cal Ramsey	July 9, 2020	November 1, 2021
"Logan's Run'd": Candice leaves on her first-ever sleepover, allowing Josh and Emily the night for themselves, which they quickly use to perform errands. Bridgette points out that they are acting "old", driving them and Alex to accompany her to the popular night club Logan's. Arriving at the club, Josh, Emily and Alex begin to party but quickly find themselves exhausted, while Bridgette tries to get acquainted with a popular YouTube influencer but is horrified to learn that he is actually a baby. Realizing that anyone in the club over thirty is deemed a VIP (Very Irrelevant Person) and killed via giant fan, Josh, Emily and Alex try to escape. When Josh is nearly discovered, Alex decides to sacrifice himself as a distraction; however, Josh, Emily and Bridgette convince him that there are benefits to growing old and rescue him from the fan. Learning that the barkeeper based his club off of Logan's Run, Alex unveils him as being an old man himself, leaving him at the mercy of the club-goers. Afterwards, the friends go out to eat pancakes, although Alex is still unnerved by having seen a man die. "Room Parents": At a parent-teacher conference, Mr. Campbell asks for volunteers for class "room parent", to which Josh inadvertently volunteers. Tasked with organizing a fundraiser for constructing a new playground, Josh befriends a single mother named Nikki (voiced by Judy Greer), who offers to assist him. Emily realizes that Nikki is trying to woo Josh, and teams up with Pearle in order to investigate. Emily confronts Josh over her findings, and he insists to have no interest in Nikki, but comes to recognize the advances she is making. Josh visits Nikki with Emily to break off their partnership for the fundraiser, only to realize that her son is a dummy and end up held at gunpoint. Tying the couple up, Nikki reveals herself as a con-artist who poses as a single mother in order to help overworked room parents and steal fundraiser money out from under them, and leaves to take the playground funds. Escaping, Josh and Emily head to the playground fundraiser to stop Nikki, and Josh manages to recover the funds while Nikki seemingly dies by crashing into a novelty fireworks factory. Returning to the fundraiser, Josh is elected room parent for life by Mr. Campbell, much to his dismay. Songs: "Turn Down for What" by DJ Snake and Lil Jon; "Crazy on You" by Heart
3	3	"Skate Dad"	Calvin Wong; Randy Myers (animation)	Minty Lewis and J. G. Quintel; Storyboarded by : Mike Bertino, Raul Guerra, J. G. Quintel, and Fabien Tong	Owen Dennis, Ryan Pequin, Andres Salaff, and Sam Spina	July 9, 2020	November 8, 2021
3	3	"100% No Stress Day"	Sean Szeles; Randy Myers (animation)	Bill Oakley and Marlena Rodriguez; Storyboarded by : Mike Bertino, Ben Adams, Raul Guerra, Miggs Perez, and Kris Wimberly	Chris Allison, Benton Connor, Aminder Dhaliwal, Madeline Queripel, Ryan Pequin, Andres Salaff, and Sam Spina	July 9, 2020	November 8, 2021
"Skate Dad": Wanting to bond with Candice, Josh takes her and Emily to a skateboard shop, determined to teach her how to skate unlike his own neglectful father. At the store, the family meets a professional skater called "The Goosh", whom Candice begins to look up to, much to Josh's envy. Buying Candice a skateboard, Josh takes her to a skate park and tries to perform an ollie to prove his skating ability, only to end up with a severe pelvic fracture. Due to Josh's injury, Emily hires Goosh to give Candice skating lessons in Josh's place. In a fit of jealousy, Josh challenges Goosh to a race down Baxter Street, the steepest road in the city. Before Emily can try to talk Josh out of it, Candice rolls down the street on her skateboard, forcing the couple and Goosh to try to rescue her. Realizing that he is becoming like his own father, Josh apologizes to Goosh and works with Emily to rescue Candice. Afterwards, Goosh declares that Josh is not a skate dad, but rather a skate father. "100% No Stress Day": Emily is diagnosed with stress, while Josh and the roommates beta-test his new game, Ladder World. Realizing Emily's diagnosis, Josh offers to take care of her to-do list while Bridgette takes her to de-stress. Josh, Alex and Candice complete the tasks, but are unable to buy ham due to a ham shortage, caused by a company called "Wurst Bros" who have been stealing hams across the city; and are additionally accosted by circus clowns pursuing Alex over money he owes them from a bet. Escaping the clowns, Josh and Alex arrive at Wurst Bros to steal a ham, but are captured and put into a meat grinder. Recovering a ham and Candice from the company daycare, they attempt to escape, while being pursued by both the ham-thieves and the clowns, causing Josh to bet their lives on a game of Ladder World. Meanwhile, Emily smokes marijuana with Bridgette to relax, but ends up getting stressed out again and rushes to find a calming activity. Returning home, she finds Josh, Alex, the ham-thieves and the clowns, and joins their game of Ladder World, winning the game and forcing the criminals and the clowns to leave. Emily realizes that video games are her de-stressing activity, while Bridgette hooks up with one of the clowns. Song: "Stay Fly" by Three 6 Mafia
4	4	"Prank War"	Sean Szeles; Randy Myers (animation)	Minty Lewis, Ryan Pequin, Matt Price, and Madeline Queripel; Storyboarded by : Ben Adams, Raul Guerra, and Fabien Tong	Owen Dennis, Ryan Pequin, and Sam Spina	July 9, 2020	November 15, 2021
4	4	"Cool Moms"	Sean Szeles; Randy Myers (animation)	Alison Agosti and Matt Price; Storyboarded by : Miggs Perez and Kris Wimberly	Owen Dennis, Ryan Pequin, and Sam Spina	July 9, 2020	November 15, 2021
"Prank War": Wanting to relive his youth, Josh sets up a prank war with the roommates who are none too impressed. He ends up befriending a "bush guy" to scare Emily and Bridgette, but thinking that he is assaulting them, they beat him into a coma. The two are arrested and Josh must wake Bush Guy or else Emily and Bridgette get charged for manslaughter. Meanwhile, Alex gives Candice candy. "Cool Moms": Mr. Campbell sets Emily up with the cool moms clique and she befriends their leader Jojo (voiced by Mo Collins). However, Jojo's style of teaching affects Emily and messes up her relationship with Candice. Meanwhile, Josh and Alex take Randy to a getaway to "rescue" his mom, Pearle. Song: "Don't Stop Me Now" by Queen
5	5	"Robot Tutor"	Sean Szeles; Randy Myers and John McIntyre (animation)	Matt Price; Storyboarded by : Mike Bertino, Mark Maxey, Miggs Perez, Kris Wimberly, Aminder Dhaliwal, Ben Adams, Raul Guerra, Tara Helfer, and Andres Salaff	Chris Allison, Ryan Pequin, Madeline Queripel, and Sam Spina	July 9, 2020	November 22, 2021
5	5	"Golden Gamer"	Calvin Wong; Randy Myers and Kevin Petrilak (animation)	Storyboarded by : Owen Dennis, Mark Maxey, Tara Helfer, Miggs Perez, Kris Wimberly, Aminder Dhaliwal, and Andres Salaff	Mike Bertino and Sam Spina	July 9, 2020	November 22, 2021
"Robot Tutor": Josh and Emily plan to spend their Spring Break by going to the beach, but must stay when Candice is revealed to have trouble learning and are equipped with a robot they cannot leave unattended. Meanwhile, Alex and Bridgette go in their stead for "divorce sex", but end up with different plans. "Golden Gamer": After Josh meets a fellow game designer who has become a huge success, Josh tries to revive his unfinished game Dude Man, resulting in him reverting to an immature twenty-something. Meanwhile, Alex tries to earn the respect of his students by performing a dangerous stunt.
6	6	"So Long Boys"	Calvin Wong; Randy Myers (animation)	Matt Price and Deepak Sethi; Storyboarded by : Ben Adams, Raul Guerra, Miggs Perez, and Kris Wimberly	Chris Allison, Aminder Dhaliwal, Ryan Pequin, and Andres Salaff	July 9, 2020	November 29, 2021
6	6	"Clap Like This"	Calvin Wong; Randy Myers (animation)	Deepak Sethi; Storyboarded by : Ben Adams, Raul Guerra, Tara Helfer, and Mark Maxey	Chris Allison, Mike Bertino, Owen Dennis, Ryan Pequin, and Sam Spina	July 9, 2020	November 29, 2021
"So Long Boys": After having a pregnancy scare, Josh agrees to have a vasectomy and brings Alex to the procedure. They discover that the facility is corrupt and Josh begins to have doubts just as Emily does so as well. At the facility, they meet two teens whom Alex is convinced are his offspring. "Clap Like This": Josh manages to sell his game Clap Like This as he, Emily, and Candice will now be rich. When the deal falls through, Josh is forced to pick up extra shifts at his old job in secret. Meanwhile, Bridgette is financially cut off at 26 and gets a job at a clothing store where the mannequins come to life.
7	7	"First Date"	Calvin Wong; Randy Myers (animation)	Marlena Rodriguez and Kristy Grant; Storyboarded by : Mark Maxey and Tara Helfer	Mike Bertino, Andres Salaff, and Sam Spina	July 9, 2020	December 6, 2021
7	7	"Snailin' It"	Sean Szeles; Randy Myers and Kevin Petrilak (animation)	Minty Lewis; Storyboarded by : Miggs Perez and Kris Wimberly	Aminder Dhaliwal and Andres Salaff	July 9, 2020	December 6, 2021
"First Date": Bridgette goes on a date with a man who is conjoined to his ex and brings Alex along as her wingman, leading to some personal issues. Meanwhile, feeling that they have lost their "spice", Josh and Emily decide to recreate their first date at a haunted attraction that is all too real. "Snailin' It": Emily does not have enough time to spend with Candice due to her job. A seemingly friendly snail allows her to use his magical time hat to get things done. Unfortunately, this causes her to rapidly age with every use and the snail tries to kidnap Candice. Elsewhere, Josh spends the day with Randy. Song: "Too Much Time on My Hands" by Styx
8	8	"The Canine Guy"	Calvin Wong; Randy Myers (animation)	Andres Salaff and Deepak Sethi; Storyboarded by : Mike Bertino, Mark Maxey, and Miggs Perez	Aminder Dhaliwal, Andres Salaff, and Sam Spina	July 9, 2020	December 13, 2021
In this half-hour special, after Alex bails on their annual Medieval Times Dinner/Jim Carrey celebration, Josh ends up meeting a genetically modified dog-human hybrid named Tery and spends time with him, much to Alex's jealousy. Meanwhile, Bridgette gets Emily away from home so that they can write more comedic song material, but Emily is constantly distracted by things Candice is doing back home, and Pearle becomes suspicious of a cold case involving Meredith Breedmore, Tery's creator, and recruits Candice and Randy to resolve the case. Song: "Don't You (Forget About Me)" by Simple Minds

=== Season 2 (2021) ===
Every episode in this season was directed by J. G. Quintel and Calvin Wong.

No. overall	No. in season	Title	Written by	Storyboard by	Original release date	TBS air date
9	1	"Josh Gets Shredded"	Gabe Delahaye	Jen Lee and J. G. Quintel	February 25, 2021	January 24, 2022
9	1	"Meet The Frackers"	Aaron Burdette	Janice Chun and Cal Ramsey	February 25, 2021	January 24, 2022
"Josh Gets Shredded": After breaking his back trying to lift Candice, Josh is told that he must exercise his core. He goes to a special gym that works its visitors until they are absolutely ripped. Soon, Josh becomes more obsessed with keeping his muscles than he does with wanting to play with Candice and tries to reach his peak. "Meet the Frackers": Randy learns through a DNA test and Pearle that his biological parents, Debra (Wendie Malick) and Wyatt (David Koechner), are fuel thieves who did time in prison and now are on the straight and narrow with their own fracking business. But when Debra and Wyatt plot to frack the apartment for natural gas, Randy must choose between being like his criminal parents and saving his adopted family. Meanwhile, Josh buys Candice a leaf blower as a toy.
10	2	"Sauceface"	Chris Kula	Raul Guerra and Jessica Xu	February 25, 2021	January 31, 2022
10	2	"Houseguest From Hell"	Melissa Hunter	David Davis and Siti Lu	February 25, 2021	January 31, 2022
"Sauceface": In this parody of Mafia crime films like the 1983 version of Scarface and the 1990 film Goodfellas, Candice and her friend Maddie start an illegal hot sauce ring (after Mr. Campbell bans hot sauce from the school cafeteria) to raise money for remote-controlled drones. "Houseguest from Hell": Emily is reunited with her obnoxious college friend Becca (voiced by Heidi Gardner), who ends up crashing at their apartment after breaking up with her latest boyfriend, Luc (voiced by Beck Bennett). Things get worse when Becca reveals that she is pregnant, is planning a home birth, and that the father of the unborn child is literally The Devil. Song: "Can't You Hear Me Knocking" by The Rolling Stones
11	3	"Joint Break"	Gabe Delahaye	Raul Guerra and Jessica Xu	February 25, 2021	February 7, 2022
11	3	"Cyber Matrix"	Gabe Delahaye	David Davis and Siti Lu	February 25, 2021	February 7, 2022
"Joint Break": In this parody of the 1991 action crime film, Point Break, Pearle reluctantly takes water aerobics (after discovering her hip replacement surgery is not covered by her insurance) where she meets a group of elderly women who live life to the fullest by robbing banks. "Cyber Matrix": Alex is finally convinced to get a new phone called Fractal which has the Siri-esque A.I. Kira. Alex becomes addicted to his new phone until he is in a suspended cocoon. The rest of the gang must rescue Alex from having his consciousness downloaded with Josh entering the cyber matrix while the rest take Kira's power. Song: "All Star" by Smash Mouth (Close Enough Mix)
12	4	"Haunted Couch"	Alison Agosti	Johnny Koester and Jen Lee	February 25, 2021	February 14, 2022
12	4	"Man Up"	Chris Kula	Johnny Koester and Jen Lee	February 25, 2021	February 14, 2022
"Haunted Couch": In this parody of the 1990 paranormal romance film Ghost, after getting ghosted by her recent boyfriend, Bridgette comes home to a new couch that Josh and Alex found and cries on it. She meets the ghost of a French aristocrat named Henri and starts a relationship with him. However, Bridgette begins to see that might be the problem. "Man Up": In this parody of the 1988 action movie Die Hard, after bailing on Emily and Candice during an alien invasion at Hollywood bank (which turned out to be a publicity stunt), Pearle teaches Josh the art of "manning up" and the skills get put to the test when a group of European terrorists hold everyone hostage at Emily's boss' holiday party. Song: "Unchained Melody" by The Righteous Brothers
13	5	"Handy"	Marlena Rodriguez	Raul Guerra and Jessica Xu	February 25, 2021	February 21, 2022
13	5	"Birthdaze"	John Aboud, Aaron Burdette and Michael Colton	Jen Lee	February 25, 2021	February 21, 2022
"Handy": Upset that Pearle would rather hire another handyman than her own adopted son, Randy goes out to sea and ends up shipwrecked on a desert island, where Bob Vila, Tim "The Toolman" Taylor from the 1990s sitcom Home Improvement, and the IKEA Man help Randy become a competent handyman. "Birthdaze": Sick of the forced, cheesy fun of children's birthday parties, Emily and Josh decide to have another party in the garage just for the adults while having a birthday party for Candice, but a birthday party magician takes the children to another dimension to teach Emily and Josh a lesson in being there for their daughter.
14	6	"Time Hooch"	Chris Kula and Craig Rowin	Raul Guerra and Jessica Xu	February 25, 2021	February 28, 2022
14	6	"World's Greatest Teacher"	Chris Kula	Janice Chun and Cal Ramsey	February 25, 2021	February 28, 2022
"Time Hooch": After Bridgette finds out that Alex never signed the divorce papers, he and Josh get drunk on some homemade moonshine the two made in college that gives them the power to time travel. Alex keeps going back to try to salvage his relationship with Bridgette, but ultimately decides to try to prevent himself from meeting her. "World's Greatest Teacher": Mr. Campbell is upstaged by a more competent female teacher named River Lake who can sing and is better at interacting with the kids. Campbell's "World's Greatest Teacher" mug urges him to sabotage River, but she catches on and decides to toy with him leading to a sing-off. Songs: "Greatest Love of All" by Whitney Houston; "I Knew You Were Waiting (For Me)" by George Michael and Aretha Franklin
15	7	"Where'd You Go, Bridgette?"	Marlena Rodriguez	Janice Chun and Cal Ramsey	February 25, 2021	March 7, 2022
15	7	"The Erotic Awakening of A. P. LaPearle"	Chris Kula	Marcy Bones and David Davis	February 25, 2021	March 7, 2022
"Where'd You Go, Bridgette?": After landing in jail due to causing chaos over being distracted by her cell phone, Pearle bails Bridgette out and keeps her in her apartment, so Bridgette can go on a no-phone cleanse, which causes Emily, Josh, and Alex to worry that Bridgette has gone missing. Things get worse when two podcasters who cover abductions and missing persons stories interview Emily, Josh, and Alex and conclude that Bridgette was murdered and eaten by the trio. "The Erotic Awakening of A.P. LaPearle": Alex's latest Viking erotica novel disgusts and offends everyone, except for Pearle. When Alex's work gets rejected due to the publisher preferring female romance and erotica writers, Pearle becomes the face of the work while Alex becomes the ghostwriter.
16	8	"Men Rock!"	Stephanie Amante-Ritter	Marcy Bones and David Davis	February 25, 2021	March 14, 2022
16	8	"Secret Horse"	Alison Agosti	Janice Chun and Cal Ramsey	February 25, 2021	March 14, 2022
"Men Rock!": Emily and Bridgette's new song "Men Rock" -- meant to be an ironic anthem about modern sexism and misogyny -- becomes a hit with an Eastern European dictator who sees the song as a celebration of sexual discrimination and oppression towards women. "Secret Horse": On a day affected by California's Santa Ana winds, a fat, wall-eyed horse (named "Pickles" by Candice) escapes a farm and ends up at the duplex. He interacts with Candice, Josh, Bridgette, Alex, Randy, Pearle and Emily and gives each of them a moment of clarity.

=== Season 3 (2022) ===
No. overall	No. in season	Title	Written by	Storyboard by	Original release date
17	1	"Where the Buffalo Roam"	Eileen Alvarez and Aaron Burdette	Siti Lu and Hye Lynn Park	April 7, 2022
17	1	"Venice Vengeance"	Eileen Alvarez	Sammy Savos and Tynan Wilson	April 7, 2022
"Where The Buffalo Roam": After years of saving their pocket change, Emily and Josh finally have enough to go on the honeymoon they never had... and end up going to a resort overrun by bison. "Venice Vengeance": Pearle helps Candice win a sandcastle-building contest. Meanwhile, Josh and Alex try to get their burgers back from a seagull.
18	2	"Hellspital"	Aaron Burdette	David Davis and Bea Ritter	April 7, 2022
18	2	"Candice Candice Revolution"	Sean O'Connor	Sammy Savos and Tynan Wilson	April 7, 2022
"Hellspital": Alex is suffering from stomach cramps but refuses to go to the hospital because of his father's death instilling him with a fear of hospitals. "Candice Candice Revolution": After Josh serves pancakes for dinner (after the planned dinner of hot dogs gets eaten by Alex after he got high and stuffed himself in the refrigerator), Candice gets it in her head that following rules are meaningless and leads the students of Chamomile Preschool into a Lord of the Flies-style anarchy. Song: "Judy is a Punk" by Ramones
19	3	"Randy Free Solos"	Aaron Burdette	Siti Lu and Jessica Xu	April 7, 2022
19	3	"Summer Job"	Alison Agosti	Sammy Savos and Tynan Wilson	April 7, 2022
"Randy Free Solos": Randy falls for a climbing instructor and lies to him by saying he can free solo. "Summer Job": Alex gets a job at Plugger-Inners (the Geek Squad-esque store that Josh works at), and Josh must keep his boss from discovering that Alex is inept at technology.
20	4	"Bridgette the Brain"	Sierra Katow	Siti Lu and Hye Lynn Park	April 7, 2022
20	4	"Never Meet Your Heroes"	Aaron Burdette	Dan Davis and Bea Ritter	April 7, 2022
"Bridgette the Brain": Bridgette's sister Olivia has always been treated as the favorite by her mother, but when Olivia announces that she is unveiling a new pill that helps with cognitive function, Bridgette takes one of the pills and becomes smarter than her sister. "Never Meet Your Heroes": Alex decides to ask his favorite author (guest voiced by Brian Blessed) to help him with his manuscript, only to learn that he has a bizarre secret behind his genius.
21	5	"Robots with Benefits"	Jordan Young	Raul Cuerra and Jessica Xu	April 7, 2022
21	5	"The Weird Kid"	Alison Agosti	Johnny Koester and Jen Lee	April 7, 2022
"Robots with Benefits": Josh and his co-workers, Dante and Anders, feel like their jobs are on the line when their boss unveils a new robot named Obo that can do their jobs at twice the speed, and resolve to try to get rid of it. "The Weird Kid": When Emily notices that Candice is starting to ignore her, she wishes she could reconnect with her daughter and, thanks to a magic Viking pendant owned by Alex, wakes up in the body of a 5-year-old. Meanwhile, the same pendant curses Alex into being obsessed with listening to "Pretty Fly (for a White Guy)" by The Offspring. Song: "Pretty Fly (for a White Guy)" by The Offspring
22	6	"Legend of the Pier"	Sierra Katow	David Davis and Bea Ritter	April 7, 2022
22	6	"Bike & Survive"	Alison Agosti, Eileen Alvarez, and Aaron Burdette	Janice Chun, Siti Lu, and William Wibisono	April 7, 2022
"Legend of the Pier": Bridgette attempts to regain her social media relevance by redoing a stunt she did on a Ferris wheel years ago. "Bike & Survive": Alex grows attached to his new exercise bike because of the instructor on the screen, but is unaware that the instructor has a dark motive.
23	7	"Halloween Enough"	Aaron Burdette, Sean O'Connor, and Opeyemi Olagbaju	David Davis, Siti Lu, Bea Ritter, and Jessica Xu	April 7, 2022
In this, the show's first Halloween special and the second full half-hour episode, after trick-or-treating gets canceled due to rain, Emily, Josh, Bridgette, Alex, Pearle, and Randy decide to stay home and tell three tales of horror, and Candice has a nightmare where her reality is part of an animated series by Cartoon Network Studios. Song: "Margaritaville" by Jimmy Buffett
24	8	"The Perfect Couple"	Alison Agosti	Janice Chun and William Wibisono	April 7, 2022
24	8	"Match Made in Valhalla"	Sierra Katow	Siti Lu and Bea Ritter	April 7, 2022
"The Perfect Couple": Sick of being invited to kiddie venues, Alex and Bridgette decide to stop hanging out with Josh and Emily. While Josh and Emily befriend a seemingly normal couple with a daughter that turns out to be a dog, Alex and Bridgette find themselves caring for a party animal named Cokey Brian. "Match Made in Valhalla": Bridgette uses her knack for matchmaking to set up her string of failed boyfriends with more compatible partners, but when she pairs Alex with a woman who loves everything Alex loves, Bridgette must choose whether to tell Alex that she still has feelings for him or let him go. She confesses that she still has feeling for Alex, who tells Bridgette he feels the same. Song: "I Believe in a Thing Called Love" by The Darkness

== Release ==
The series was announced in May 2017, four months after Quintel's previous series, Regular Show, concluded its run on the sibling Cartoon Network. The series was originally announced to air on TBS, but was delayed several times. It would later be revealed that TBS had planned to premiere the show as part of its own animation block, but those plans fell through when production on lead-in program The Cops was shut down after its co-creator Louis C.K. admitted to several instances of sexual misconduct. On October 29, 2019, it was announced that the series would instead move to HBO Max. The second half of the third episode was premiered at the Annecy International Animated Film Festival on June 15, 2020.

On August 6, 2020, the series was renewed for a second season. The following month, the series was distributed internationally through Netflix as a Netflix Original, beginning September 14, 2020 in Latin America.

The second season premiered on February 25, 2021 on HBO Max. Prior to the season premiere, a third season was announced on February 10, 2021. The second season was released internationally on Netflix on May 26, 2021. The series altogether was removed from Netflix globally in May 2023.

On October 24, 2021, the first two seasons became available to buy digitally on iTunes. The third season was released digitally on May 8, 2022.

With the announcement of TBS and TNT's Front Row blocks, the series debuted on the former network on October 25, 2021.

The third season premiered on April 7, 2022 on HBO Max. On July 15, 2022, HBO Max cancelled the series after three seasons.

On August 17, 2022, the service announced the removal of several shows, including Close Enough. The show was removed from digital purchase in October 2023 alongside all other shows that used to be off Max.

== Reception ==
Review aggregator Rotten Tomatoes reported an approval rating of 100% based on 19 reviews, with an average rating of 8/10, for the first season. The website's critical consensus reads, "Completely absurd and yet, utterly relatable, Close Enough captures the strange experience that is being an adult." On Metacritic, it has a weighted average score of 74 out of 100 based on 6 reviews, indicating "generally favorable reviews".

== See also ==
- Regular Show
- The Marvelous Misadventures of Flapjack
