= Rough Draft =

Rough Draft may refer to:

- Rough Draft (novel), a 2005 novel by Sergey Lukyanenko
- Rough Draft: Pop Culture the Way It Almost Was, a 2001 book by Modern Humorist
- Rough Draft Brewing Company, an American microbrewery
- Rough Draft Studios, an American animation studio, and its South Korean sister studio
- Draft document, a preliminary stage of a written work
- "Rough Draft", a song by Yellowcard from One for the Kids
