= The Comebacks =

- Theatrical release poster
- Directed by: Tom Brady
- Screenplay by: Ed Yeager; Joey Gutierrez
- Story by: John Aboud; Michael Colton; Adam Jay Epstein; Andrew Jacobson
- Produced by: Robert L. Levy; Peter Abrams; Andrew Panay
- Starring: David Koechner
- Cinematography: Anthony B. Richmond
- Edited by: Alan Edward Bell
- Music by: Christopher Lennertz
- Production company: Tapestry Films
- Distributed by: 20th Century Fox; Fox Atomic
- Release date: October 19, 2007
- Running time: 84 minutes
- Country: United States
- Language: English
- Box office: $13.5 million

The Comebacks is a 2007 American satirical comedy film directed by Tom Brady and story by Andrew Jacobson. This film is a parody of the clichés and plots of the sports film genre. It parodies 21 popular sports films along with historical real world sports events, credible live football action and excerpts from The Onion Movie inserted throughout the film. In the UK, Greece, Finland, Australia and New Zealand this film is called Sports Movie. The film was released to theaters on October 19, 2007 by 20th Century Fox and Fox Atomic. It was partially filmed at the Cal State Fullerton Titan Stadium in Fullerton, California and Shepherd Stadium at Pierce College in Los Angeles, California. The film performed poorly at the box office and was panned by critics.

== Plot ==
Coach Lambeau Fields (David Koechner), the worst coach in the history of sports, is convinced by fellow coach Freddie Wiseman (Carl Weathers) to return to the field for one last shot. Assuring his long-suffering wife, Barb (Melora Hardin), that he will not ignore his family again, Coach moves them to Plainfolk, Texas to redeem himself as coach of the Heartland State University Comebacks.

Although the team and townsfolk are leery of the newcomer's approach, the Coach uses his unorthodox methods and "game films" to whip this group of rag-tags into shape – both on and off the field. Coach Fields leads the team to the South-Southwest Conference Championship at the 2nd Annual Toilet Bowl. The team's winning season has consequences: Barb leaves Coach after he devotes all his time to football.

The Comebacks face their fiercest opponents yet, the heavily armed Lone Star State Penitentiary Unbeatables, coached by Coach Fields' former best friend Freddie Wiseman. In the final showdown of the game, Coach realizes it's not all about winning, and sends a message to Barb via the TV camera. The Comebacks come back against the heavily favored Unbeatables, as they find new strength and courage from the emotional moment. Barb arrives at the stadium and runs to embrace the finally victorious Coach, but Fields is subsequently hit by a bus in a surprise attack from Freddie. Coach groans in agony after a TV reporter asks how it feels to finally be a winner.

== Cast ==
- David Koechner as Coach Lambeau Fields, the coach of the Heartland Comebacks
- Carl Weathers as Freddie Wiseman, the coach of the Lone Star State Unbeatables
- Melora Hardin as Barb Fields, the wife of Lambeau Fields
- Matthew Lawrence as Lance Truman, quarterback
- Brooke Nevin as Michelle Fields, the daughter of Lambeau Fields and a gymnast
- Robert Ri'chard as Aseel Tare ("uh-seel tah-ree", mispronounced by Coach Fields as "ACL tear"), running back
- Noureen DeWulf as Jizminder Featherfoot, kicker
- Nick Searcy as Mr. Truman, Lance's father
- Jackie Long as Trotter, wide receiver
- Jesse Garcia as Jorge Juanson, receiver
- George Back as Buddy Boy, lineman
- Martin Spanjers as Randy Randinger, towel boy
- Jermaine Williams as iPod
- Jillian Grace as Maria Sharapova
- Chauntal Lewis as Freddy's Girl
- Shannon Woodward as Emily, lesbian gymnast attracted to Michelle

Cameos

- Eric Christian Olsen as Foreign Exchange Student
- Andy Dick as Toilet Bowl Referee
- Dennis Rodman as The Warden
- Bradley Cooper as Cowboy
- Dax Shepard as Sheriff
- Jon Gries as Barber
- Will Arnett as Mailman
- Kerri Kenney as Sports Judge
- Lawrence Taylor as Himself
- Michael Irvin as Himself
- Eric Dickerson as Himself
- Stacy Keibler as All-American Mom, a character in the toilet bowl halftime show.
- Drew Lachey as All-American Dad, a character in the toilet bowl halftime show.
- Jason Sklar and Randy Sklar as Superfans
- Frank Caliendo as Chip Imitation

== Reception ==
On the review aggregator website Rotten Tomatoes, 10% of 31 critics' reviews are positive, with an average rating of 3/10. The website's consensus reads: "Full of groin-centric humor and tired sports clichés, The Comebacks is poor even by parody movie standards." Metacritic, which uses a weighted average, assigned the film a score of 25 out of 100, based on 13 critics, indicating "generally unfavorable" reviews.

Blake French of filmcritic.com gave it a 4 out of 5 saying: "for those who would rather step on a tack than sit through another Miracle, this film is a long overdue revival to the spoof genre."

Comebacks' stunt actor Mark Chadwick was nominated for the best fire stunt scene by the World Stunt Awards for 2008.

=== Box office ===
The Comebacks had an opening weekend of $5.6 million at #5. At the end of its box office run, it grossed $13.3 million in the US and $139,173 in foreign countries. The movie had a budget of $20 million, saw an international box office of $13.5 million with DVD sales of $9.5 million. Streaming sales are still to be determined.

== Soundtrack ==
The Comebacks' soundtrack features the original song "T&A" performed by White Beaver and written by Christopher Lennertz.

== See also ==
- List of American football films
