= A Futile and Stupid Gesture =

- Film poster
- Directed by: David Wain
- Screenplay by: John Aboud; Michael Colton
- Based on: A Futile and Stupid Gesture: How Doug Kenney and National Lampoon Changed Comedy Forever by Josh Karp
- Produced by: Jonathan Stern; Peter Principato; Ted Sarandos
- Starring: Will Forte; Domhnall Gleeson; Martin Mull; Joel McHale; Thomas Lennon; John Gemberling; Matt Walsh; Rick Glassman; Jon Daly; Seth Green; Emmy Rossum
- Cinematography: Kevin Atkinson
- Edited by: Jamie Gross; David Egan; Robert Nassau
- Production companies: Abominable Pictures; Principato-Young Entertainment
- Distributed by: Netflix
- Release dates: January 24, 2018 (Sundance); January 26, 2018 (Netflix)
- Running time: 101 minutes
- Country: United States
- Language: English

A Futile and Stupid Gesture is a 2018 American biographical comedy drama film directed by David Wain and written by Michael Colton and John Aboud, based on Josh Karp's book A Futile and Stupid Gesture: How Doug Kenney and National Lampoon Changed Comedy Forever. The film stars Will Forte as comedy writer Douglas Kenney, during the rise and fall of National Lampoon. This is Martin Mull's final film appearance before his death in 2024.

A Futile and Stupid Gesture had its world premiere at the 2018 Sundance Film Festival on January 24, 2018, and was released on January 26, 2018, by Netflix.

== Plot ==
The film's timeline stretches from 1964 to 1980 and opens with Douglas Kenney and his friend Henry Beard celebrating the release of their book, Bored of the Rings, with The Harvard Lampoon staff.

Graduating from Harvard, Doug convinces Henry not to go to law school but instead publish a monthly magazine: the National Lampoon. Though Doug is the magazine's main creative voice, he realizes that there would be no magazine without the guidance of Henry. Doug becomes the comedy writer and Henry the business manager, while the magazine also has a thriving art department.

Doug and Henry get financing from Matty Simmons. All of the writers work hard to be funny and meet deadlines. Work is a party atmosphere and illicit drug use is prevalent. The magazine is not initially a success, until lawsuits are threatened by Disney, Volkswagen, Mormons, and many other established names. The comedy world is changed, and the magazine pushes the acceptance of satire and parody with each edition.

Doug, due to burnout, suddenly leaves for nine months with a one-line note to Henry. The magazine stays successful under Henry. After five years Simmons agrees to a buyout and they each collect $3.5 million, a request demanded by Henry and Doug from the start. Henry, being unhappy and greatly stressed, takes his check and immediately exits the magazine.

National Lampoon expands to an hour-long radio show, attracting emerging comedians like Chevy Chase, Bill Murray, and Gilda Radner. But Lorne Michaels buys them all out by signing them over to Saturday Night Live. Special editions of the magazine are published such as one mocking high school yearbooks.

Doug moves to movies and writes Animal House in 1978. With the success of the film, cocaine takes over Doug's life. As disputes with studio executives continue, Doug writes Caddyshack. Not liking his work, he embarrasses himself being drunk and high at a press conference for the film.

Doug, Henry, and Chris Hoffman all sell National Lampoon to Simmons' Twenty First Century Communications. Doug's cocaine addiction takes over. Chevy takes Doug to Hawai‘i to try to help him kick his addiction, but he relapses.

In 1980, at age 33, Doug's body is found at the bottom of a Hawaii cliff (with his glasses and shoes neatly stacked at the top edge). As he has narrated his life's story through the movie, Doug is displeased to see everyone sad at his funeral. The movie ends with Henry starting a food fight at the wake (just like at the Harvard Lampoon years ago).

== Cast ==
- Will Forte as Douglas Kenney
  - Martin Mull as modern Douglas, the narrator
  - Frank and Morgan Gingerich as young Douglas
- Domhnall Gleeson as Henry Beard
- Neil Casey as Brian McConnachie
- Jon Daly as Bill Murray
- Nelson Franklin as P. J. O'Rourke
- John Gemberling as John Belushi
- Rick Glassman as Harold Ramis
- Seth Green as Christopher Guest
- Max Greenfield as Chris Miller
- Harry Groener as Harry Kenney, Douglas' father
- Camille Guaty as Alex Garcia-Mata
- Ed Helms as Tom Snyder
- Thomas Lennon as Michael O'Donoghue
- Joe Lo Truglio as Brad Zotti
- Matt Lucas as Tony Hendra
- Natasha Lyonne as Anne Beatts
- Joel McHale as Chevy Chase
- Annette O'Toole as Stephanie Kenney, Douglas' mother
- Emmy Rossum as Kathryn Walker
- Jackie Tohn as Gilda Radner
- Matt Walsh as Matty Simmons
- Finn Wittrock as Tim Matheson
- Elvy Yost as Mary Marshmallow
- David Wain as Interviewer
- Ben Campbell as Harvard Jester
- Jon Klaft as Preppy Student
- Brad Morris as Peter Ivers
- Rick Overton as First Publisher
- Mark Metcalf as Second Publisher
- David Krumholtz & Mitch Hurwitz as Time-Life Publishers
- Michael Sherman as Ed Sullivan
- Kerri Kenney-Silver as Sullivan Producer
- Bob Stephenson as Construction Worker
- Liz Femi as Skeptical Black Woman
- Chris Redd as Skeptical Black Man
- Meera Rohit Kumbhani as Elaine
- Armen Weitzman as Lorne Michaels
- Lonny Ross as Ivan Reitman
- Steven Sims as Stephen Furst
- Brian Huskey as John Landis
- Rich Sommer as Harry Crane
- Carla Gallo as Lucy Fisher
- Andrew Gray McDonnell as Michael O'Keefe
- Erv Dahl as Rodney Dangerfield
- Paul Scheer as Paul Shaffer
- Lindsey Kraft as Gwyneth Cravens

A photo of Paul Rudd, who has appeared in many of Wain's projects, was used as Larry Kroger (one of the main protagonists of Animal House).

== Production ==
Principal photography began in Los Angeles, California on April 14, 2016.

== Release ==
The film's poster — showing Forte as Kenney looking worried as the muzzle of a revolver is pressed to his head, with the tagline, "If you don't watch this movie, we'll kill Will Forte" — is a reference to an infamous 1973 National Lampoon cover featuring a dog, looking worried, with the caption: "If You Don't Buy This Magazine, We'll Kill This Dog".

A single trailer was released on December 20, 2017. The film had its world premiere at the 2018 Sundance Film Festival on January 24, and was then released on Netflix on January 26, 2018.

== Reception ==
On Rotten Tomatoes, the film has an approval rating of 67%, based on 43 reviews, with an average rating of 6.3/10. The site's consensus reads, "A Futile and Stupid Gesture entertainingly recreates the birth of an influential comedic movement, even if it struggles to cover its creative ground." On Metacritic, the film has a score of 55 out of 100, based on 15 critics, indicating "mixed or average" reviews.

Writing for TheWrap, Todd Gilchrist opined, "Even if the casting choices in portraying some of iconic talents in Kenney's orbit are occasionally questionable – a detail the film gleefully acknowledges – there's something delightful about watching actors known for comedy now try to capture the sound or energy of the performers who inspired them." Ellin Stein of Slate stated, "There's a sense that the filmmakers have bitten off more than they can chew by trying to cram both the biography and the panoramic overview into one feature."
