= Caitlin McGee =

American actress

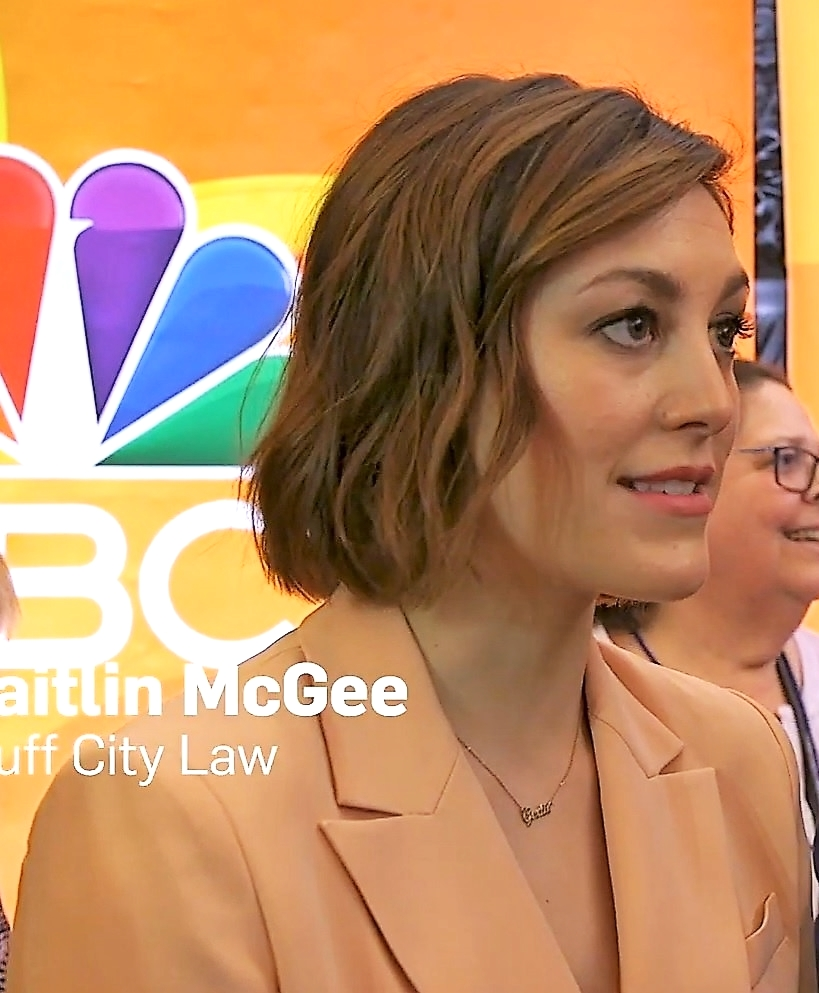
- McGee in 2019
- Born: New York, New York
- Education: Wagner College (B.A., 2010)
- Occupation: Actress
- Years active: 2013–present
- Spouse: Patrick Woodall (m. 2021)
- Children: 2

Caitlin McGee is an American actress. She is best known for her role as attorney Sydney Strait on the legal drama Bluff City Law. She was also a regular on the ABC comedy Home Economics.

== Career ==
McGee has appeared in minor roles on shows such as Blue Bloods, Chicago Med, Grey's Anatomy, and The Marvelous Mrs. Maisel.

McGee was cast in the NBC legal drama Bluff City Law in 2019 as Sydney Strait, the daughter of an accomplished litigator and an accomplished corporate attorney herself. She was named the grand marshal of the AAA Texas 500 in 2019 as a part of a promotion for Bluff City Law.

In October 2019, McGee played Emma, the love interest of Dev Patel’s Joshua, in the Season One episode of Amazon Prime Video’s anthology series Modern Love titled “When Cupid is a Prying Journalist.”

In July 2020, McGee was cast in the pilot of Home Economics as Sarah.

== Personal life ==
McGee grew up in Newton, Massachusetts, where she attended Newton North High School, graduating in 2006. She is a graduate of Wagner College with a bachelor's degree in Theatre Performance and Speech.

McGee started dating actor Patrick Woodall in 2014, and got married in 2021. Their first child, a daughter, was born on September 27, 2022.

== Filmography ==
=== Film ===
| Year | Title | Role | Notes |
|---|---|---|---|
| 2013 | Me, Cake, and Toaster Oven | Jen | Short film |
| 2014 | Winter Slides | Jonathan's Wife | Short film |
| 2014 | Motion Picture Martyr | Jessica Sanders | |
| 2014 | Broken Breath | Christina | Short film |
| 2019 | Standing Up, Falling Down | Taylor | |
| 2019 | Plus One | Jackie | |
| 2019 | Modern Love | Emma | |
| 2020 | Cosmic Fling | Beatrice | Short film |
| 2020 | Egg | Julia (Egg's Wife) | Short film |
| 2023 | Mr. Monk's Last Case: A Monk Movie | Molly Evans | |

=== Television ===
| Year | Title | Role | Notes |
|---|---|---|---|
| 2014 | Unforgettable | Louisa | Episode: "The Island" |
| 2015 | Blue Bloods | Melissa Rella | Episode: "Power Players" |
| 2015 | Sex & Drugs & Rock & Roll | Katie | Episode: "What You Like Is In The Limo" |
| 2016 | Shades of Blue | Andrea | 2 episodes |
| 2016 | Halt and Catch Fire | Kimberly Gould | Episode: "And She Was" |
| 2016 | Crunch Time | Hailey Gale | TV movie |
| 2017 | The Great Indoors | Kaylie | Episode: "DTR" |
| 2017 | An American Girl Story – Ivy & Julie 1976: A Happy Balance | Coach Gloria | TV movie |
| 2017 | The Marvelous Mrs. Maisel | Vonnie | 2 episodes |
| 2017 | Libby and Malcolm | Zev Adler | TV movie |
| 2018 | Chicago Med | Hannah | Episode: "Lemons and Lemonade" |
| 2018 | Grey's Anatomy | Liz Brosniak | 2 episodes |
| 2018 | I'm Dying Up Here | Pam | Episode: "Plus One" |
| 2018 | History of Them | Skylar | TV movie |
| 2019 | You're the Worst | Gemma | Episode: "The Intransigence of Love" |
| 2019 | Modern Love | Emma | 2 episodes |
| 2019 | Bluff City Law | Sydney Strait | Main role, 10 episodes |
| 2020–2025 | Mythic Quest | Sue Gorgon | Recurring role, 10 episodes |
| 2021–2023 | Home Economics | Sarah | Main role |
| 2025 | All's Fair | Bethany Morse | Episode: "This Is Me Trying" |
| 2026 | Margo's Got Money Troubles | Sarah Gable | Episode: "The Hungry Ghost" |
| 2026 | S.W.A.T. Exiles | Miranda Seitzmeier | Recurring role |
