= Cheetah (magazine) =

Short-lived American 1960s music magazine

- Debut issue cover
- Editor: Lawrence Dietz
- Former editors: Jules Siegel
- Staff writers: Robert Christgau, Ellen Willis
- Categories: Lifestyle
- Frequency: Monthly
- Format: Magazine
- Publisher: Matty Simmons
- Total circulation: 250,000 (1968)
- Founded: October 1967
- Final issue: May 1968
- Company: Twenty First Century Communications, Inc.
- Country: U.S.
- Based in: New York City
- Language: English

Cheetah was an American rock music and counterculture magazine launched in October 1967. Although influential, its run was short-lived, closing in May 1968. The magazine's name was the result of a licensing deal with the popular Cheetah chain of nightclubs, which in 1967 had outlets in New York City, Los Angeles, Chicago, and Montreal.

Cheetah aimed to fill "a vital gap that exist[ed] between teen- and teeny-bopper publications and such magazines as Playboy and Esquire." Published by Matty Simmons, a founder of Diners Club, and his partner Leonard Mogel, Cheetah was the first project of their Twenty First Century Communications, Inc. (later known as the publisher of National Lampoon).

Acting as Cheetah's first editor was novelist-journalist Jules Siegel (briefly an associate of Beach Boys songwriter Brian Wilson), although he was soon replaced by Lawrence Dietz, assisted by Ellen Willis. At the time, a girlfriend of fellow Cheetah writer and music critic Robert Christgau, Willis went on to become the first rock critic for The New Yorker and later wrote for Rolling Stone, Village Voice, and other papers.

== See also ==
- "Goodbye Surfing, Hello God!" — notable article in Cheetah about Brian Wilson written by Julus Siegel.
