= Lewis E. Braverman =

American endocrinologist (1929–2019)

- Born: March 30, 1929; Boston, Massachusetts, US
- Died: June 10, 2019 (aged 90); Boston, Massachusetts, US
- Occupation: Medical doctor
- Known for: Discovery that humans convert thyroxine to triiodothyronine Amiodarone-induced thyroid dysfunction Work on thyrotoxicosis factitia; environmental pollutants as endocrine disruptors
- Medical career
- Institutions: Tufts St Elizabeth's Hospital, Boston; University of Massachusetts Medical Center; Boston University
- Sub-specialties: Endocrinology
- Research: Study of thyroid hormone

Lewis E. Braverman (March 30, 1929 – June 10, 2019) was a U.S. endocrinologist who specialized in thyroid gland problems. He discovered that humans converted thyroxine to triiodothyronine. He was a mentor to physicians for over 40 years.

== Early life and education ==
Lewis E. Braverman was born in Boston on March 30, 1929 where his father was a general practitioner and his mother helped run the practice. He grew up in Quincy, Massachusetts and went to Milton Academy in neighboring Milton, Massachusetts. He attended Harvard College, graduated in 1951, and then went to Johns Hopkins University School of Medicine, graduating MD in 1955.

== Career ==
Braverman was an intern at Beth Israel Hospital in Boston. Thereafter he served for two years in the U.S. military in France under the Berry Plan. He returned to the United States for an internal medicine residency at Boston City Hospital, and trained with the director of the Thorndike Memorial Laboratory.

From 1962 to 1975 Braverman was chief of endocrinology at Tufts University School of Medicine St Elizabeth's Hospital, and from 1975 to 1998 at the University of Massachusetts Medical Center. From 1999 until retirement in 2017, he was chief of endocrinology at Boston University.

=== Work and legacy ===
Braverman discovered that thyroid hormone is metabolized to triiodo-L-thyronine (T3) in tissues outside the thyroid gland in humans, and published this in 1970 with his colleagues Sidney H. Ingbar and Kenneth Sterling.

He found the cause of a 1984 outbreak of thyrotoxicosis in Minnesota, South Dakota, and Iowa was ground beef contaminated with tissue from the animals' thyroid glands.

Braverman is also credited with the discovery that the heart drug amiodarone was one of the most common causes of iodine-induced thyrotoxicosis, a finding which he published, with others, in 1985.

== Personal life ==
He was married and had two sons, Daniel and William Braverman. He died from Waldenström macroglobulinemia on June 10, 2019, aged 90 years.
