= Deepak Sethi =

Canadian-American screenwriter

- Born: Ontario, Canada
- Education: University of Western Ontario
- Occupations: Screenwriter, film director, comedian, voice actor
- Years active: 2010-present

Deepak Sethi is a Canadian-American screenwriter, comedian, film director, and voice actor. Sethi has written episodes of Family Guy, Brickleberry, Apple & Onion, and Close Enough.

== Life and career ==
Born and raised in Ontario, Canada, Sethi was an ethnic food salesman for his family's food company. While working in the food industry and doing his MBA, Sethi was discovered through his comedy blog which attracted over 2.2 million followers. Actress Alyssa Milano, a reader of Sethi's blog, passed Sethi's writing to writer Ricky Blitt who helped Sethi get a job on Family Guy.

Sethi was heckled by an audience member at a stand-up comedy show in Las Vegas, the crowd member insinuating that Sethi was a terrorist. Sethi was nominated for an Annie Award for his writing in 2021.

In 2021, Sethi wrote and directed the short film Coffee Shop Names which was nominated for a Tribeca X award at the Tribeca Film Festival and was acquired by HBO Max in September 2021.
