= Matty Simmons =

American businessman (1926–2020)

- Born: Martin Gerald Simmons; October 3, 1926; Brooklyn, New York City, U.S.
- Died: April 29, 2020 (aged 93); Los Angeles, California, U.S.
- Occupations: Publisher, producer, writer
- Employer(s): New York World-Telegram and Sun; Diners Club International
- Organization(s): Twenty First Century Communications, Inc./National Lampoon, Inc.
- Known for: Publisher of National Lampoon; Author of If You Don't Buy This Book, We'll Kill This Dog!
- Spouses: Korky Kelley (m. 1945, divorced) Lee Easton (m. 1952, divorced) Patti Browne (died 2017)
- Children: 4 (Michael Simmons, Andrew Simmons, Julie Simmons-Lynch, Kate Simmons)

Martin Gerald "Matty" Simmons (October 3, 1926 – April 29, 2020) was an American film and television producer, newspaper reporter for the New York World-Telegram and Sun, and Executive Vice President of Diners Club, the first credit card company. Simmons gained his greatest fame while the chief executive officer of Twenty First Century Communications (renamed National Lampoon Inc., after its best-known product).

== Life and career ==
Simmons was born in Brooklyn, New York in 1926, the son of Kate (Shapiro), a homemaker, and Irving Simmons, a sign painter. He served in the U.S. Army during World War II.

In 1950, Frank X. McNamara, Ralph Schneider, Alfred S. Bloomingdale, and Simmons formed Diners Club, the first independent payment card company in the world, successfully establishing the financial service of issuing travel and entertainment (T&E) credit cards as a viable business. In 1952, Simmons and fellow Diners Club employee Leonard A. Mogel created Diners Club News (later known as Signature Magazine).

Simmons and his brother Don formed Simmons Associates in the 1950s, publishing a book called On the House: History and Guide to Dining and Night Life, "a history of and guide to four hundred outstanding restaurants and nightclubs." The book featured "decorations" by Antonio Fabrés.

In 1967, Simmons and Mogel left Diners Club and formed Twenty First Century Communications, Inc.. The company's first publication was Cheetah, a counterculture magazine connected with the popular Cheetah nightclub chain. While Cheetah failed, the partners had more success with Weight Watchers magazine (which launched in January 1968) and National Lampoon magazine (launched in 1970). From 1971 to 1973, Twenty First Century Communications published a revived Liberty magazine.

In the mid-1970s, National Lampoon expanded into radio, theater, records, and film. Simmons is given credit for raiding "Chicago’s satirical Second City troupe to bring Belushi to New York for the 1973 revue National Lampoon's Lemmings."

In 1977, Simmons and Mogel added Heavy Metal magazine to the roster, publishing the graphic fantasy magazine under the subsidiary HM Communications, Inc. In 1981, Simmons installed his daughter, Julie Simmons-Lynch, as editor of Heavy Metal, a position she held for more than eleven years. In 1985, National Lampoon's entire editorial staff was fired, with the top positions replaced by Simmons' sons Michael Simmons and Andy Simmons. (Michael Simmons had been in various prior positions at the company, including being the first compiler of the "True Facts" section of the magazine; working as "the doorman at the Village Gate where National Lampoon's Lemmings played and for which he handled underground/rock press and radio PR"; acting as "company manager for their second stage show, The National Lampoon Show"; and heading a rockabilly band that backed a 1977 stage iteration of the show.)

In March 1989, Simmons sold his ten-percent share in National Lampoon, Inc. to film producers Daniel Grodnik and Tim Matheson for six dollars a share (more than $761,400), resigned as chairman of the board, and departed the company along with his son Michael Simmons.

Simmons's film credits included being the producer of National Lampoon's Animal House and the National Lampoon's Vacation film series.

He wrote seven books, including If You Don't Buy This Book, We'll Kill This Dog!, published in 1994. His last one, Fat, Drunk, and Stupid: The Making of Animal House, was published by St. Martin's Press in 2012.

In the 2018 film, A Futile and Stupid Gesture, about the rise and fall of National Lampoon, Simmons was played by comedian Matt Walsh.

On April 29, 2020, Simmons died at the age of 93 in Los Angeles from a brief illness.

== Publications ==
Simmons' and Leonard Mogel's publishing venture, Twenty First Century Communications, Inc. (renamed National Lampoon, Inc. in 1979) operated from 1967 to 1990 (although Simmons and Mogel sold their shares and left National Lampoon, Inc. c. March 1989). The company was responsible for publishing a number of magazines — and supplementary material — from the late 1960s through the 1980s. Besides Simmons and Mogel, other employees of the company included William T. Lippe, who went from associate publisher of National Lampoon to vice president, advertising sales. Gerald L. "Jerry" Taylor was National Lampoon's publisher from October 1971 to at least the end of 1974; he later became publisher of Harper's Bazaar.

- Cheetah (Oct 1967–May 1968)
- Weight Watchers magazine (Jan 1968–1975; publication taken over by Family Media)
- National Lampoon magazine (Apr 1970–Oct 1990; publication taken over by J2 Communications) — also regularly published National Lampoon "special editions" which were sold simultaneously on newsstands. Some of the special editions were "best-of" omnibus collections; others were entirely original. Additional projects included a calendar, a songbook, a collection of transfer designs for T-shirts, and a number of books.
- Liberty (Summer 1971–Summer 1973; publication taken over by Liberty Library Corporation)
- Heavy Metal magazine (under the imprint HM Communications, Inc.) (Apr 1977–Oct 1990; publication taken over by J2 Communications)

== Books ==
- —; Simmons, Don (1955). On the House. New York: Coward-McCann. OCLC 1079764000.
- —; Boal, Sam; Steinbeck, John, eds. (1962). The Best of the Diners' Club magazine. New York: Regents American Pub. Corp.; distributed by Doubleday.
- — (1966). The Diners' Club Drink Book. New York: Lancer Books.
- — (1969). The New Diners Club Drink Book. Signet Books.
- — (1970). The Card Castle. New York: Putnam. OCLC 94118.
- — (1994). If You Don't Buy This Book, We'll Kill This Dog!. Barricade Books. ISBN 978-1569800027.
- — (1995). The Credit Card Catastrophe: The 20th Century Phenomenon That Changed the World. Barricade Books. ISBN 978-1569800386.
- — (2012). Fat, Drunk, and Stupid: The Making of Animal House. St. Martin's Press. ISBN 978-0312552268.
