= Home Economics (TV series) =

American sitcom (2021-2023)

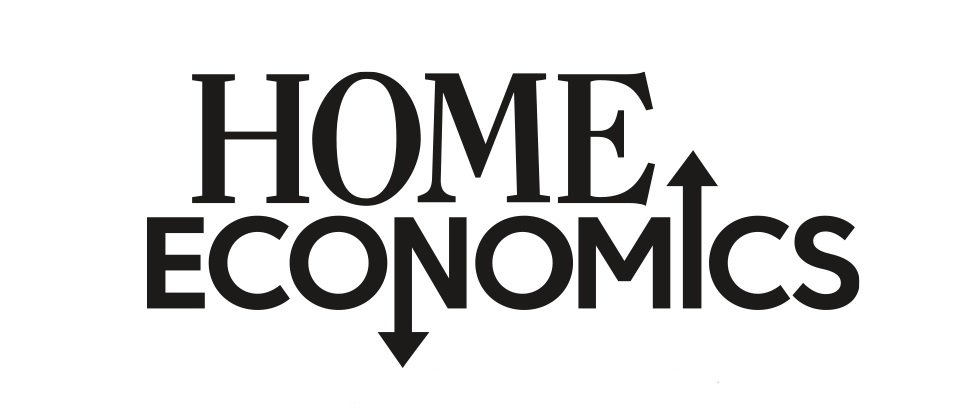
- Genre: Sitcom
- Created by: Michael Colton & John Aboud
- Starring: Topher Grace; Caitlin McGee; Jimmy Tatro; Karla Souza; Sasheer Zamata; Shiloh Bearman; Jordyn Starr Curet; JeCobi Swain; Chloe Jo Rountree; Lidia Porto
- Music by: Frank Ciampi & Benjamin Zecker
- Country of origin: United States
- Original language: English
- No. of seasons: 3
- No. of episodes: 42

Production
- Executive producers: Dean Holland; Topher Grace; Eric Tannenbaum; Kim Tannenbaum; Michael Colton; John Aboud; Jason Wang; Tucker Cawley; Julieanne Smolinski; Victor Nelli Jr.
- Producers: Jess Pineda; Kevin C. Slattery
- Cinematography: Giovani Lampassi; Beaudine Credle
- Editors: Omar Hassan-Reep; Andy Morrish; Scott Ashby; Dan Riddle; Ryan Johnson; Hallie Faben Comfort
- Camera setup: Single-camera
- Running time: 20–21 minutes
- Production companies: Colton & Aboud; The Tannenbaum Company; ABC Signature; Lionsgate Television

Original release
- Network: ABC
- Release: April 7, 2021 – January 18, 2023

Home Economics is an American television sitcom created by Michael Colton and John Aboud that aired on ABC from April 7, 2021 to January 18, 2023. In May 2021, the series was renewed for a second season which premiered on September 22, 2021. In May 2022, the series was renewed for a third and final season which premiered on September 21, 2022. In September 2023, the series was canceled after three seasons.

== Premise ==
Home Economics follows the lives of three siblings, originally from Sacramento. Tom, the oldest, his wife Marina, and their three children are considered a middle class family. The middle sibling, Sarah, her wife Denise, and their two adopted children live in a tiny downtown apartment and are barely scraping by on their meager incomes. The youngest, Connor, is very well-off financially but unlucky in love, and lives in a house with a panoramic view of San Francisco Bay, as the series begins with him finalizing a divorce.

== Cast and characters ==
=== Main ===
- Topher Grace as Tom, a middle-class author who is struggling. He is the oldest of the three siblings and is married to Marina, with whom he has three kids.
- Caitlin McGee as Sarah, the middle sibling, a child therapist who is barely making ends meet. She is married to Denise and has two adopted kids.
- Jimmy Tatro as Connor, the youngest sibling, who runs his own private equity firm and is very well-off. He is getting divorced and has a daughter, Gretchen.
- Karla Souza as Marina, a former lawyer who is Tom's wife, now raising their three children as a stay-at-home mom. Souza described her character as "very blunt and just speaks her mind" and went on to say about Marina's relationship with Sarah's wife Denise that "Sasheer and I also have great chemistry and they definitely wrote to that. It's a pair developed throughout the season."
- Sasheer Zamata as Denise, a teacher who is Sarah's wife
- Shiloh Bearman as Gretchen, Connor's daughter
- Jordyn Curet as Shamiah, Sarah's and Denise's daughter
- JeCobi Swain as Kelvin, Sarah's and Denise's son
- Chloe Jo Rountree as Camila, Tom's and Marina's daughter
- Lidia Porto as Lupe (seasons 2–3; recurring season 1), Connor's housekeeper

=== Recurring ===
- Nora Dunn as Muriel, Tom, Sarah, and Connor's mother
- Phil Reeves as Marshall, Tom, Sarah, and Connor's father
- Tetona Jackson as Jojo (season 2), Denise's sister and Connor's new love interest
- Marc-Sully Saint-Fleur as Mr. Zarrow (season 2), a co-worker of Sarah's

=== Guest stars ===
- Dustin Ybarra as Spags (seasons 1–2), a family friend of the Hayworths ("Mermaid Taffeta Wedding Dress, $1,999", "Poker Game, $800 Buy-In")
- Justine Lupe as Emily (seasons 1–2), Connor's ex-wife and Gretchen's mother ("The Triangle Shirtwaist Fire: An Oral History (Used), $11", "Box of King-Size Candy Bars, $48.99", "Pregnancy Test, $12.98")
- Nicole Byer as Amanda (seasons 1–2), a book editor who wants to publish Tom's book ("Opus Cabernet, 2015, $500", "Chorizo with Mojo Verde and Chicharrón, $45", "Men's Water-Resistant Watch, $289")
- Ray Wise as Frank (season 2), Connor's client who has a San Francisco 49ers suite ("49ers Foam Fingers, $7")
- Jerry Rice as himself (season 2) ("49ers Foam Fingers, $7")
- Scott Van Pelt as himself (season 2) ("49ers Foam Fingers, $7")
- 24kGoldn as himself (season 2) ("49ers Foam Fingers, $7")
- Roselyn Sánchez as Sofía (season 2), a famous chef that Tom is ghostwriting for ("Chorizo with Mojo Verde and Chicharrón, $45", "Speeding Ticket, $180", "Men's Water-Resistant Watch, $289")
- Danica McKellar as Alison (season 2), the principal of Windmount Academy ("Windmount Academy, $42,000/Year", "FaceFlop App, $1.99")
- June Diane Raphael as Lauren (season 2), the vice principal of Windmount Academy ("Mango THC Gummies, $18", "Book Deal, Terms Negotiable)
- Cheech Marin as Roberto (season 2), Marina's father ("Round Trip Ticket SAN-OAK, $234", "Wedding Bouquet, $125")
- Mark Cuban as himself (season 2), Spags' friend ("Poker Game, $800 Buy-In")
- Yvette Nicole Brown as Donna (season 3) ("Mickey Ears, $19.99")
- Tyler "Ninja" Blevins as Ninja (season 3) ("Melatonin 10 Mg Tablets, $14.99")
- Kelly Ripa as herself (season 3) ("Live with Kelly and Ryan Hoodie, Complimentary")
- Ryan Seacrest as himself (season 3) ("Live with Kelly and Ryan Hoodie, Complimentary")
- Casey Wilson as Harmony (season 3), Tom's #1 fan of his published novel later revealed to be Tom, Sarah, and Connor's paternal half-sister ("Novel Signed by Author, $22.19", "Wheel of Vegan Brie, $24")
- Kim Coles as Tamara (season 3), Denise's mother ("Sunday New York Times, $6")
- Gary Anthony Williams as Jay (season 3), Denise's father ("Sunday New York Times, $6")
- Eddie Cibrian as Santiago (season 3) ("Sunday New York Times, $6", "Gallon of Milk, $4.35", "Limited Edition Boom Boom Dojo JollyBot, $45.99")

== Episodes ==
=== Series overview ===
Season	Episodes	Originally released	
Season	Episodes	First released	Last released
1	7	April 7, 2021	May 19, 2021
2	22	September 22, 2021	May 18, 2022
3	13	September 21, 2022	January 18, 2023

=== Season 1 (2021) ===
No. overall	No. in season	Title	Directed by	Written by	Original release date	U.S. viewers (millions)
1	1	"Pilot"	Dean Holland	Michael Colton & John Aboud	April 7, 2021	3.11
After introducing the characters, Tom debates whether or not to risk embarrassment to ask Connor for a loan when he needs it. The first time the siblings get together after Connor moves to town, they send their kids off the play and immediately begin feuding over Tom's new book, which Sarah thinks is sexist and Connor hasn't read yet. Sarah is upset and they leave, however Connor tries to convince her to stay. Marina prompts Tom to ask Connor for money leading to the sibling's parents reveal that Connor was taking them on a trip and leaving the others during Thanksgiving. After noticing that Connor is acting odd, they realize that his wife recently left him and he has been keeping it from them. After promising to get through their problems together, the siblings ride around in toy cars. After cancelling the Thanksgiving trip, the kids spy on their parents, who are secretly furious.
2	2	"Mermaid Taffeta Wedding Dress, $1,999"	Dean Holland	Michael Colton & John Aboud	April 14, 2021	2.92
Tom continues to work on his book about the siblings, hoping that when they find out that it is about their family, they will not be mad. Meanwhile, the Hayworths have begun hosting family brunches at each of their houses, rotating every week. Denise expresses to Sarah her regret that they couldn't have had an actual wedding, as they could not afford it. Connor announces that the family has been invited to the wedding of Spags, an old family friend who used to annoy Tom, had a crush on Sarah, and invented Drawer D'eouvres with Connor, who has been tasked with writing a toast for the ceremony. He calls on Tom, the novelist, to help him, however he rejects all of Tom's ideas for toasts, asking for odder and odder scripts and then throwing them away. At the wedding, Tom and Connor get into a fight, however make up when Connor tells Tom that he only asked Tom to rewrite so many toasts because he wanted to spend time with him, and Sarah and Denise steal the first dance at the wedding. Spags's wife, Teresa resolves never to invite their family to anything ever again.
3	3	"Bounce House Rental, $250"	Gail Mancuso	Tucker Cawley	April 21, 2021	2.63
Connor organizes an epic cousin sleepover to take Gretchen's mind off the divorce. Sarah uses her counseling skills, while Tom tries to prove he's the "fun uncle."
4	4	"Triple Scoop of Ice Cream, $6.39"	Randall Keenan Winston	Michael Colton & John Aboud	April 28, 2021	2.46
Sarah and Tom are at Connor's house when, to their surprise, their parents arrive to hang out with Gretchen. Upset that their own kids are getting the short stick when it comes to grandparent time, Sarah and Tom want to even the score. However, the more time their parents spend at their houses, the more Sarah and Tom realize they should have left well enough alone.
5	5	"35% of Allied Harness and Sling LTD, $3,000,000"	Randall Keenan Winston	Julieanne Smolinski	May 5, 2021	2.20
Marina considers going back to work at her law firm, but worries about Tom taking care of the house and kids. When Tom is doing a great job, however, it seems to upset Marina even more, leading to Tom messing up the house intentionally. Elsewhere, Sarah tries to make a few bucks doing online therapy for pet owners while Kelvin hangs out at Connor's house. Worried that Kelvin is embracing materialism when he wants to know about Connor's business, Denise intervenes, only to get drawn in herself by the rush of multi-million dollar deals.
6	6	"The Triangle Shirtwaist Fire: An Oral History (Used), $11"	Gail Mancuso	Jess Pineda	May 12, 2021	2.32
Connor throws a birthday party at his home for his ex-wife Emily, trying to show he's the bigger man and has moved on but later revealing he's still hurting. Emily keeps talking about her new boyfriend who hasn't shown up yet, only to later admit there is no boyfriend. Tom tries to prove to a skeptical Marina that he still has game and can get another woman at the party interested in him, but he consistently fails. However, Marina later learns she has no game either. Denise makes a fool of herself around Emily, while trying to deny she's attracted to her. Meanwhile, Sarah learns of her reputation for giving original, but lousy gifts.
7	7	"Opus One Cabernet, 2015, $500"	Rebecca Asher	Ashly Perez	May 19, 2021	2.32
As Muriel and Marshall arrive at Connor's house for their anniversary, their kids try to avoid their annual tradition of ruining the celebration with their constant fighting. However, Tom gets a call from a publisher, and accidentally emails an excerpt of his book to "Connor" instead of "Connie", the publisher. This gets the children fighting anew as they all learn the book is about them, but Muriel and Marshall seem excited about their portrayals. Meanwhile, Denise gets angry when she reads the excerpt and realizes Marina broke confidence and told Tom about their "normal club", in which the two spouses regularly sip wine and trash the family they married into. The publisher tries to get Tom to fictionalize the characters more, but Tom refuses, stating how the character flaws of his family are actually positives. Connie surprises Tom by calling back and saying she still wants to publish.

=== Season 2 (2021–22) ===
No. overall	No. in season	Title	Directed by	Written by	Original release date	U.S. viewers (millions)
8	1	"49ers Foam Fingers, $7"	Dean Holland	Michael Colton & John Aboud	September 22, 2021	2.21
Connor has an opportunity to woo clients in a luxury suite at the San Francisco 49ers game, and uses his extra ticket to invite Marina because she knows much more about football than Tom. Connor gets regular seating tickets for the rest of his family. Sarah becomes concerned when Shamiah reveals her interest in becoming a cheerleader. Meanwhile, Tom is the lucky fan selected to attempt a 20-yard field goal during halftime for future game tickets.
9	2	"Chorizo with Mojo Verde and Chicharrón, $45"	Randall Keenan Winston	Tucker Cawley	September 29, 2021	2.14
At his publisher's prodding, Tom considers ghostwriting a book for a celebrity chef (Roselyn Sánchez), but it seems the chef's "freshness" goes beyond food. Elsewhere, a lonely Connor is interested in Lindsay (Anna Akana), one of Sarah's and Denise's friends whom they consider to be a champion for women's causes. The two are shocked when Lindsay actually starts dating Connor.
10	3	"Bottle Service, $800 Plus Tip (25% Suggested)"	Matt Sohn	Julieanne Smolinski	October 6, 2021	1.92
Connor wants to go to a club where he has VIP privileges in hopes of meeting a woman. He asks Tom to be his wing man, but the girls all tag along. Connor starts insulting Tom as a means of pumping himself up in front of a group of females, but it backfires. Tom later lets loose when he thinks he's taken ecstasy (in reality it was an aspirin). Sarah and Denise meet another couple, and soon realize why they don't party so much anymore. Meanwhile, Marina spends the whole night in a text battle with her nemesis -- a fellow parent in the planning group at her kids' school.
11	4	"Windmount Academy, $42,000/Year"	Jude Weng	Jason Belleville	October 13, 2021	2.06
While attending a student art show at Gretchen's exclusive private school, Sarah learns of an opening for a counselor position. Before her interview, Sarah becomes convinced that Connor bribed the administrator (Danica McKellar), and she makes a fool of herself before learning she's off-base. Meanwhile, Marina sees signs that Camila is losing her Mexican culture, so she hosts a dinner only to realize she has no idea how to cook a traditional Mexican meal.
12	5	"Giant Jenga, $120"	Ryan Case	Kriss Turner Towner	October 20, 2021	1.66
Game night at Connor's becomes stressful, and not just because of Marina's ultra-competitiveness. Tom recognizes Connor's new love interest as Jessica (Sarah Wright), the girl who broke his heart at summer camp 20 years ago by not showing up for their planned romantic meeting on a dock. Adding to the tension, Sarah has never told her brother that she and Jessica were kissing when Jessica was supposed to be meeting Tom.
13	6	"Box of King-Size Candy Bars, $48.99"	Dean Holland	Melissa Hunter	October 27, 2021	1.96
Following a heated discussion about which neighborhood would be best for their kids' trick-or-treating, the parents all decide to have their kids go door-to-door in their own neighborhoods. Before long, all three groups realize they miss hanging out with each other.
14	7	"Speeding Ticket, $180"	Kabir Akhtar	Damir Konjicija & Dario Konjicija	November 3, 2021	1.85
With Tom in Puerto Rico to do research for Sofia Salazar's book, Marina is both shocked and jealous to learn that Sofia is bringing out an adventurous side of Tom that she has never seen herself. Realizing what is happening, Tom tries to prove to Marina that he can be adventurous at home, too. Meanwhile, Sarah and Denise are disappointed when Shamiah is confiding in Connor instead of them, until they learn that the discussions are about a boy Shamiah likes.
15	8	"Two Thousand Pounds of Sand, $240"	Kabir Akhtar	Ashly Perez	November 17, 2021	2.21
Tom, Sarah and Connor try to prove to their parents that they can host a Thanksgiving just as good as the ones their mom and dad have had, but things quickly go awry. Muriel arrives in a depressed state after learning she is too old to even get a part in a local production of Menopause The Musical, so the kids devise a plan to make mom feel needed. Meanwhile, Denise's "influencer" sister joins the family feast, later admitting she is broke and wants to move into Sarah's and Denise's already crowded apartment.
16	9	"Secret Santa Gift, $25 Limit"	Ryan Case	Tasha Henderson	December 1, 2021	2.10
17	10	"Men's Water-Resistant Watch, $289"	Kimmy Gatewood	Tucker Cawley	January 5, 2022	1.85
18	11	"Camping Tent, $39.99"	Ryan Case	Julieanne Smolinski	January 12, 2022	2.11
19	12	"Round Trip Ticket SAN-OAK, $234"	Betsy Thomas	Jason Belleville	January 19, 2022	1.96
20	13	"Pregnancy Test, $12.98"	Michael McDonald	Kriss Turner Towner	February 2, 2022	2.17
21	14	"Salsa Competition Entry Fee, $45"	Matt Sohn	Damir Konjicija & Dario Konjicija	February 23, 2022	1.86
22	15	"FaceFlop App, $1.99"	Gail Mancuso	Tucker Cawley	March 2, 2022	1.80
23	16	"Keg of Light Beer, $180"	Betsy Thomas	Tasha Henderson	March 16, 2022	1.84
24	17	"Workout Leggings, $29"	Giovanni Lampassi	Paola Tapia-Limón	March 23, 2022	1.89
25	18	"Poker Game, $800 Buy-In"	Dean Holland	Melissa Hunter	April 6, 2022	1.67
As Marina has a night with Denise, Camilla grows upset due to a ghost. Marina learns that Denise believes in ghosts. Meanwhile, Tom and Sarah join in on Connor's poker night with Terrence, another friend, Spags and his friend Mark Cuban. Connor grows annoyed by his siblings ruining the night.
26	19	"Animatronic Gorilla, $2,200"	Michael McDonald	Julieanne Smolinksi	April 13, 2022	1.67
27	20	"Mango THC Gummies, $18"	Dean Holland	Jason Belleville	April 20, 2022	1.71
28	21	"Book Deal, Terms Negotiable"	Helena Lamb	Lynn Sternberger	May 11, 2022	1.73
29	22	"Ticket to Space, $1 Million"	Dean Holland	Michael Colton & John Aboud	May 18, 2022	1.81

=== Season 3 (2022–23) ===
No. overall	No. in season	Title	Directed by	Written by	Original release date	U.S. viewers (millions)
30	1	"Mickey Ears, $19.99"	Victor Nelli Jr.	Michael Colton & John Aboud	September 21, 2022	2.10
While the family visits Disneyland, Connor tries to keep the secret that he's the money behind Tom's publisher staying afloat and being able to release his book. Meanwhile, Sarah jokes to Denise that with her 90 percent discount, they could actually afford private school tuition for their children. She's then shocked when Denise begins to think private school might be a good idea.
31	2	"Melatonin 10 Mg Tablets, $14.99"	Dean Holland	Melissa Hunter	September 28, 2022	1.86
32	3	"Sushi for Twelve, $482 plus delivery"	Betsy Thomas	Jason Belleville	October 5, 2022	1.87
33	4	"Wedding Bouquet, $125"	Michael McDonald	Julieanne Smolinski	October 12, 2022	1.93
34	5	"Live with Kelly and Ryan Hoodie, Complimentary"	Betsy Thomas	Damir Konjicija & Dario Konjicija	October 19, 2022	1.92
35	6	"Novel Signed by Author, $22.19"	Victor Nelli Jr.	Tucker Cawley	October 26, 2022	2.23
36	7	"Model Train Set, $150"	Giovani Lampassi	Lauren Tyler	November 2, 2022	2.02
37	8	"Wheel of Vegan Brie, $24"	Keith Powell	Lynn Sternberger	November 16, 2022	2.07
38	9	"Sunday New York Times, $6"	Jimmy Tatro	Tasha Henderson	November 30, 2022	1.98
39	10	"Santa Suit Rental, $25 Per Day"	Shahrzad Davani	Jason Belleville	December 7, 2022	1.91
40	11	"Gallon of Milk, $4.35"	Jay Chandrasekhar	Glenn Boozan	January 4, 2023	2.16
41	12	"Limited Edition Boom Boom Dojo JollyBot, $45.99"	Gail Mancuso	Julieanne Smolinski	January 11, 2023	2.21
42	13	"Emergency Preparedness Kit, $129.99"	Victor Nelli Jr.	Tucker Cawley	January 18, 2023	2.14

== Production ==
=== Development ===
On October 25, 2018, it was announced that Fox had put the project in development with a script commitment and a penalty attached. On February 13, 2020, ABC gave the production a pilot order. The pilot was written by Michael Colton and John Aboud. On December 8, 2020, ABC picked up Home Economics to series. It was created by Colton and Aboud, who are expected to executive produce alongside Topher Grace, Eric Tannenbaum, and Kim Tannenbaum. On May 14, 2021, ABC renewed the series for a second season. On October 26, 2021, the second season received a back-order of nine episodes. On May 13, 2022, ABC renewed the series for a third season. On September 29, 2023, ABC canceled the series after three seasons.

=== Casting ===
On February 14, 2020, Grace was cast to headline Home Economics. On July 16, 2020, Caitlin McGee, Karla Souza, and Sasheer Zamata joined the main cast. Upon the series order announcement, Jimmy Tatro, Shiloh Bearman, Jordyn Starr Curet, Chloe Jo Rountree, and JeCobi Swain were cast in undisclosed starring roles. Nicole Byer plays Tom's editor Amanda in the season's final episode. After the finale, star Topher Grace expressed excitement that the character might return in the second season in a more prominent role. On August 26, 2021, it was reported that Danica McKellar was cast to guest star in an episode that aired on October 13, 2021.

=== Filming ===
The series began filming on February 1, 2021, in Los Angeles, California.

== Broadcast ==
The first season of Home Economics premiered on April 7, 2021 and concluded on May 19, 2021 on ABC. The second season premiered on September 22, 2021 and concluded on May 18, 2022. The third and final season premiered on September 21, 2022 and the series finale aired on January 18, 2023.

In Canada, the first two seasons were aired on CTV when it began simulcasting the series alongside the US broadcast. The final season aired on Global.

== Reception ==
=== Critical response ===
On Rotten Tomatoes, the series' first season holds an approval rating of 82% based on 11 critic reviews, with an average rating of 7/10. The website's critical consensus reads, "Not all of Home Economics' calculations add up, but believable chemistry between its well-cast siblings and a real sense of affection equals a lot of potential for positive growth." On Metacritic, the season has a weighted average score of 64 out of 100 based on 6 critic reviews, indicating "generally favorable reviews".

Dave Nemetz of TVLine gave the series a B and called it "a breezy watch with a casually zany hangout energy, and it hits on some touchy subjects without getting too deep with them ... It's tough to talk about money sometimes, but the Home Economics crew finds a way to make it almost fun." In a review, Joel Keller of Decider said "The income disparities among the three siblings are a good way into the show, as a way to define and differentiate them. But what's going to carry the show is having them more fleshed out as characters and the squabbling but loving relationship they have with each other. Yes, it's funny when they all chase each other down the street in some of the fleet of miniature cars Connor bought for his daughter. But jokes about their relative net worths really won't take the show very far." Daniel D'Addario of Variety praised the show's style and tone, saying "It's early days for a show with a fair amount on its mind and a good sense of who its three leads are. It's worth hoping that the show pursues the instinct that led to develop three sharply observed characters, and refines those parts of the show that are not there yet."

=== Ratings ===
==== Overall ====
Viewership and ratings per season of Home Economics
Season	Timeslot (ET)	Episodes	First aired		Last aired		TV season	Viewership rank	Avg. viewers (millions)	Avg. 18–49 rating
Season	Timeslot (ET)	Episodes	Date	Viewers (millions)	Date	Viewers (millions)	TV season	Viewership rank	Avg. viewers (millions)	Avg. 18–49 rating
1	Wednesday 8:30 p.m.	7	April 7, 2021	3.11	May 19, 2021	2.32	2020–21	90	3.50	0.7
2	Wednesday 9:30 p.m.	22	September 22, 2021	2.21	May 18, 2022	1.81	2021–22	82	2.87	0.5
3	Wednesday 9:30 p.m.	13	September 21, 2022	2.10	January 18, 2023	2.14	2022–23	79	2.92	0.5

==== Season 1 ====
Viewership and ratings per episode of Home Economics
No.	Title	Air date	Rating (18–49)	Viewers (millions)	DVR (18–49)	DVR viewers (millions)	Total (18–49)	Total viewers (millions)
1	"Pilot"	April 7, 2021	0.6	3.11	0.3	1.28	0.9	4.39
2	"Mermaid Taffeta Wedding Dress, $1,999"	April 14, 2021	0.5	2.92	0.3	1.20	0.8	4.11
3	"Bounce House Rental, $250"	April 21, 2021	0.4	2.63	0.3	1.05	0.7	3.66
4	"Triple Scoop of Ice Cream, $6.39"	April 28, 2021	0.4	2.46	0.2	0.82	0.6	3.15
5	"35% of Allied Harness and Sling LTD, $3,000,000"	May 5, 2021	0.5	2.20	0.2	0.78	0.6	2.98
6	"The Triangle Shirtwaist Fire: An Oral History (Used), $11"	May 12, 2021	0.5	2.32	0.2	0.76	0.6	3.08
7	"Opus One Cabernet, 2015, $500"	May 19, 2021	0.4	2.32	0.2	0.80	0.6	3.12

==== Season 2 ====
Viewership and ratings per episode of Home Economics
No.	Title	Air date	Rating (18–49)	Viewers (millions)	DVR (18–49)	DVR viewers (millions)	Total (18–49)	Total viewers (millions)
1	"49ers Foam Fingers, $7"	September 22, 2021	0.4	2.21	0.2	0.86	0.6	3.07 (Note: Live+7 ratings were unavailable, so Live+3 ratings have been used instead.)
2	"Chorizo with Mojo Verde and Chicharrón, $45"	September 29, 2021	0.4	2.14	0.1	0.84	0.5	2.97
3	"Bottle Service, $800 Plus Tip (25% Suggested)"	October 6, 2021	0.4	1.92	0.1	0.71	0.5	2.63
4	"Windmount Academy, $42,000/Year"	October 13, 2021	0.4	2.06	0.2	0.86	0.5	2.92
5	"Giant Jenga, $120"	October 20, 2021	0.3	1.66	0.2	0.82	0.5	2.49
6	"Box of King-Size Candy Bars, $48.99"	October 27, 2021	0.3	1.96	0.2	0.77	0.5	2.73
7	"Speeding Ticket, $180"	November 3, 2021	0.3	1.85	0.1	0.65	0.4	2.50
8	"Two Thousand Pounds of Sand, $240"	November 17, 2021	0.4	2.21	0.2	0.99	0.6	3.20
9	"Secret Santa Gift, $25 Limit"	December 1, 2021	0.3	2.10	0.2	0.98	0.6	3.08
10	"Men's Water-Resistant Watch, $289"	January 5, 2022	0.3	1.85	0.2	0.75	0.5	2.60
11	"Camping Tent, $39.99"	January 12, 2022	0.4	2.11	—N/a	—N/a	—N/a	—N/a
12	"Round Trip Ticket SAN-OAK, $234"	January 19, 2022	0.4	1.96	0.2	0.85	0.5	2.80
13	"Pregnancy Test, $12.98"	February 2, 2022	0.4	2.17	—N/a	—N/a	—N/a	—N/a
14	"Salsa Competition Entry Fee, $45"	February 23, 2022	0.3	1.86	0.2	0.84	0.5	2.69
15	"FaceFlop App, $1.99"	March 2, 2022	0.3	1.80	0.2	0.71	0.4	2.50
16	"Keg of Light Beer, $180"	March 16, 2022	0.3	1.84	0.2	0.88	0.5	2.72
17	"Workout Leggings, $29"	March 23, 2022	0.4	1.89	0.2	0.98	0.6	2.87
18	"Poker Game, $800 Buy-In"	April 6, 2022	0.3	1.67	0.2	0.99	0.5	2.66
19	"Animatronic Gorilla, $2,200"	April 13, 2022	0.3	1.67	0.2	0.87	0.5	2.54
20	"Mango THC Gummies, $18"	April 20, 2022	0.3	1.71	0.2	0.93	0.5	2.64
21	"Book Deal, Terms Negotiable"	May 11, 2022	0.2	1.73	—N/a	—N/a	—N/a	—N/a
22	"Ticket to Space, $1 Million"	May 18, 2022	0.3	1.81	—N/a	—N/a	—N/a	—N/a

==== Season 3 ====
Viewership and ratings per episode of Home Economics
No.	Title	Air date	Rating (18–49)	Viewers (millions)	DVR (18–49)	DVR viewers (millions)	Total (18–49)	Total viewers (millions)
1	"Mickey Ears, $19.99"	September 21, 2022	0.4	2.10	0.2	0.92	0.6	3.02
2	"Melatonin 10 Mg Tablets, $14.99"	September 28, 2022	0.3	1.86	0.2	0.83	0.5	2.69
3	"Sushi for Twelve, $482 plus delivery"	October 5, 2022	0.3	1.87	0.2	0.84	0.5	2.71
4	"Wedding Bouquet, $125"	October 12, 2022	0.3	1.93	0.2	0.79	0.5	2.72
5	"Live with Kelly and Ryan Hoodie, Complimentary"	October 19, 2022	0.4	1.92	0.2	0.97	0.6	2.89
6	"Novel Signed by Author, $22.19"	October 26, 2022	0.4	2.23	0.2	0.88	0.6	3.11
7	"Model Train Set, $150"	November 2, 2022	0.4	2.02	0.2	0.85	0.6	2.87
8	"Wheel of Vegan Brie, $24"	November 16, 2022	0.3	2.07	0.2	0.88	0.5	2.95
9	"Sunday New York Times, $6"	November 30, 2022	0.4	1.98	—N/a	—N/a	—N/a	—N/a
10	"Santa Suit Rental, $25 Per Day"	December 7, 2022	0.3	1.91	—N/a	—N/a	—N/a	—N/a
11	"Gallon of Milk, $4.35"	January 4, 2023	0.4	2.16	0.2	0.99	0.6	3.15
12	"Limited Edition Boom Boom Dojo JollyBot, $45.99"	January 11, 2023	0.3	2.21	0.2	0.93	0.5	3.14
13	"Emergency Preparedness Kit, $129.99"	January 18, 2023	0.4	2.14	0.2	0.89	0.6	3.02
