= Modern Humorist =

Defunct online humor magazine

- Website type: Humor website
- Available in: English
- Creators: John Aboud and Michael Colton
- Website: www.modernhumorist.com
- Launched: 2000
- Current status: Defunct (2003)

Modern Humorist was a United States–based humor webzine founded in 2000 by John Aboud and Michael Colton (who later became panelists on VH1's Best Week Ever), and managed by CEO Kate Barker. Its board of directors included feature film producer Frank Marshall and comedian Jon Stewart.

A competitor of The Onion, Modern Humorist stopped publishing new material in 2003. The site's archives remain online and free to the public. It was nominated for a Webby Award in the Humor category in 2001 and in 2004, losing to The Onion both times.

== Books ==
Modern Humorist produced three books:

- (2001) My First Presidentiary (ISBN 0-609-80818-4)
- (2001) Rough Draft: Pop Culture the Way It Almost Was (ISBN 0-609-80817-6)
- (2002) One Nation, Extra Cheese (ISBN 0-609-80979-2)

== Notable contributors ==
- John Aboud
- Andy Borowitz
- Jake Tapper
- Tim Carvell
- Daniel Chun
- Michael Colton
- Fred Graver
- Kevin Guilfoile
- Francis Heaney
- Gersh Kuntzman
- Seth Mnookin
- Jay Pinkerton
- Nathan Rabin
- Daniel Radosh
- John Warner
