= Jules Siegel =

American journalist (1935–2012)

- Siegel, 1966
- Born: October 21, 1935
- Died: November 17, 2012 (aged 77)
- Education: Cornell University, Hunter College
- Occupations: Novelist, journalist, graphic designer
- Writing career
- Years active: 1964–2012

Jules Siegel (October 21, 1935 – November 17, 2012) was a novelist, journalist, and graphic designer who is best known as one of the earliest writers to treat rock music as a serious art form, although his writings about rock constituted only a small part of his output. His work appeared over the years in Playboy, Best American Short Stories, Library of America's Writing Los Angeles, and many other publications. He occasionally contributed book reviews to the San Francisco Chronicle, and he administered newsroom-l, an email discussion list for journalists.

His articles about Bob Dylan, Brian Wilson, Thomas Pynchon, and other prominent Americans were based on his personal acquaintance and extensive direct interviews with the subjects. "Goodbye Surfing, Hello God!" has been anthologized several times and is used as a primary source in every book about Wilson's struggle to complete Smile.

== Background and Bob Dylan coverage ==
Siegel attended Cornell University with Pynchon during the 1953–54 term and graduated from Hunter College with a degree in English and philosophy in 1959. He was involved in politics, working for both the Nixon and Kennedy campaigns. He began working as a journalist in 1964.

In 1966, The Saturday Evening Post published an article by Siegel about Bob Dylan. According to Siegel, the article helped establish his credentials on the Sunset Strip, "which is about the only place that sort of thing counted then. [...] My taking rock music seriously was considered one of my little quirks."

== "Goodbye Surfing, Hello God!" ==
Siegel moved from New York to Los Angeles and, from late 1966 to early 1967, had a close acquaintance with Brian Wilson of the Beach Boys. Dylan biographer Clinton Heylin wrote that Siegel took an interest in the Beach Boys and their increasingly sophisticated music after Pynchon recommended their 1966 album Pet Sounds. Conversely, in a 1977 article, Siegel said Pynchon had suggested that he write about the Beach Boys, but that he had introduced Pet Sounds to Pynchon. In 1998, Siegel wrote he was personally introduced to Wilson by Beach Boys associate David Anderle, who had enjoyed Siegel's article about Dylan and suggested that Siegel write about Wilson.

Brian was a genius and, if anything, I underestimated him. ... It took quite a bit of convincing to get the Saturday Evening Post to assign a story on the Beach Boys. They didn't really want it and when they got it they couldn't believe that I took Brian so seriously.

— Jules Siegel

Impressed by Wilson's musical abilities, Siegel documented his observations for a memoir presold to The Saturday Evening Post. He assimilated into a coterie that accompanied Wilson for much of the band's Smile era, a circle that Siegel later called the "Beach Boys marijuana-consumption squad". By early 1967, Wilson was finding Smile hard to finish and had grown suspicious of his associates, including Siegel. Siegel said that Wilson "had forgotten that I was a journalist, and the reason he got rid of me was because Anderle reminded him of that—because of a disagreement that David and I had about what I would and wouldn't write [...] After that [my girlfriend], I and Pynchon went to Studio A and [Michael] Vosse was there, and he said, 'No, you're barred.'"

According to Siegel, The Saturday Evening Post rejected his story due to his enthusiastic praise of Wilson's work. The article was instead published in October 1967 in the first issue of the magazine Cheetah. It contains many anecdotes associated with the album and the mythology surrounding its collapse.

In a 1971 interview, Brian's brother and bandmate Carl Wilson said that Siegel's writing "and a lot of that stuff that went around before really turned [Brian] off." According to Siegel, Brian disliked the article for portraying his "flip-out" during the sessions. (Note: Anderle later alleged that Siegel had inflated the myth by writing falsehoods so that he could appear more "important". Siegel responded: "If it weren't so stupid, it would be libelous. [...] I admired Brian a lot and I also liked him. [...] I wasn't aware of him as a myth. I just wrote down what I saw and heard. [...] It was fun hanging out with Brian and getting stoned but it was hardly important in the sense that David means.")

== Other work and later years ==
In 1977, Playboy published Siegel's article "Who Is Thomas Pynchon and why did he take off with my wife?" The article recounts his relationship with Pynchon and Pynchon's affair with Siegel's second wife. According to journalist Adam Ellsworth, "In certain circles, this article is far better known than 'Goodbye Surfing, Hello God!' It is certainly more personal".

Beginning in 1981, Siegel lived and worked in Mexico (moving to Cancún in 1983). He was also active in book art. Three of his works are in the Museum of Modern Art's Artists Books Collection. His books and calligraphic journals were exhibited at Franklin Furnace in 1978.

On November 17, 2012, Siegel died of a heart attack at age 77.

== Bibliography ==
- — (1971). Record: The Journal of an Egomaniac. Straight Arrow.
