= Esther E. Freeman =

American physician

Esther Ellen Freeman
- Born: 1979 (age 46–47)
- Education: London School of Hygiene and Tropical Medicine; Dartmouth College; Harvard Medical School
- Scientific career
- Workplaces: Harvard Medical School; Massachusetts General Hospital
- Thesis: The role of herpes simplex virus Type 2 in the spread and control of HIV in four Sub-Saharan African Cities (2006)

Esther Ellen Freeman (born 1979) is an American physician who is an Associate Professor of Dermatology at the Harvard Medical School and Director of Global Health Dermatology at Massachusetts General Hospital. Her research considers HIV infection with AIDS-defining malignancies, including Kaposi's sarcoma. During the COVID-19 pandemic Freeman established the American Academy of Dermatology register of COVID-19 skin complaints, through which she identified novel symptoms of COVID-19 in the skin.

== Early life and education ==
Freeman attended Milton Academy. As a child she was a competitive skier, and competed in the national championships at the age of twelve. By the age of fifteen Freeman was a member of the United States freestyle skiing team. Freeman earned her undergraduate degree at Dartmouth College. Throughout her college career she skied in World Cup competitions and was a member of the Dartmouth sailing team. During her studies at Dartmouth, Freeman spent time in Kenya and Mexico. In 2002 she was selected as a Marshall Scholar, and moved to the United Kingdom to complete her graduate studies. She was a graduate student at the London School of Hygiene & Tropical Medicine, where she studied HIV epidemiology. After completing her doctorate Freeman returned to the United States, where she started a medical degree at Harvard Medical School, and soon after completed her specialist training in dermatology, at the Harvard Combined Dermatology Residency Training program.

== Research and career ==
In 2011 Freeman began work with the World Health Organization, drafting guidelines on how to treat skin conditions that were associated with HIV in the developing world. For these efforts she was awarded the 2012 American Academy of Dermatology Members Making a Difference Award.

In 2013 Freeman was appointed Director of Global Health Dermatology at the Massachusetts General Hospital. Here she continued to investigate HIV dermatology, with a particular focus on Kaposi's sarcoma. She serves on the leadership team of the International Alliance of Global Health Dermatology(GLODERM).

=== Leadership during the COVID-19 pandemic and other outbreaks ===
Freeman was a member of the American Academy of Dermatology task force on coronavirus disease. As part of this effort, she launched and helped to compile a registry of skin complaints of COVID-19 patients, identifying several new symptoms of COVID-19 that present in the skin. Freeman has since been involved in leadership for several other outbreaks, including the global Mpox outbreak in 2022, where she served on the WHO Clinical Guidelines Committee for Mpox and also compiled an international registry to more deeply characterize skin manifestations of the virus. Her work on outbreaks has been features in the Washington Post and NPR, among others.

== Selected publications ==
- Freeman, Esther E; Weiss, Helen A; Glynn, Judith R; Cross, Pamela L; Whitworth, James A; Hayes, Richard J (2006). "Herpes simplex virus 2 infection increases HIV acquisition in men and women: systematic review and meta-analysis of longitudinal studies". AIDS. 20 (1): 73–83. doi:10.1097/01.aids.0000198081.09337.a7. ISSN 0269-9370. PMID 16327322. S2CID 37946948.
- Freeman, Esther E.; Orroth, Kate K.; White, Richard G.; Glynn, Judith R.; Bakker, Roel; Boily, Marie-Claude; Habbema, Dik; Buvé, Anne; Hayes, Richard (August 1, 2007). "Proportion of new HIV infections attributable to herpes simplex 2 increases over time: simulations of the changing role of sexually transmitted infections in sub-Saharan African HIV epidemics". Sexually Transmitted Infections. 83 (suppl 1): i17–i24. doi:10.1136/sti.2006.023549. ISSN 1368-4973. PMID 17405782. S2CID 30331411.
- White, R. G.; Glynn, J. R.; Orroth, K. K.; Freeman, E. E.; Bakker, R.; Weiss, H. A.; Kumaranayake, L.; Habbema, J. D. F.; Buvé, A.; Hayes, R. J. (2008). "Male circumcision for HIV prevention in sub-Saharan Africa: who, what and when?". AIDS. 22 (14): 1841–1850. doi:10.1097/QAD.0b013e32830e0137. OCLC 714926474. PMID 18753931.
- Freeman, Esther E.; Yardman-Frank, J. Michael; Kilmer, Jennifer; et al. (August 26, 2026). "Global Disparities in Access to Dermatological Care". JAMA Dermatology. doi:10.1001/jamadermatol.2026.3112.
