= Rough Draft: Pop Culture the Way It Almost Was =

Rough Draft: Pop Culture the Way It Almost Was is a 2001 humor book by Modern Humorist, consisting of illustrations of fictional early versions of real products.
