= Marty McInnis =

American former ice hockey player (born 1970)

- Born: June 2, 1970 (age 56) Hingham, Massachusetts, U.S.
- Height: 5 ft 11 in (180 cm)
- Weight: 190 lb (86 kg; 13 st 8 lb)
- Position: Left wing
- Shot: Left
- Played for: New York Islanders; Calgary Flames; Mighty Ducks of Anaheim; Boston Bruins
- National team: United States
- NHL draft: 163rd overall, 1988; New York Islanders
- Playing career: 1992–2003
- Coaching career

Coaching career (HC unless noted)
- 2013–2021: Boston College (assistant)

Medal record

Representing United States

Men's ice hockey

World Championship
Bronze medal – third place	1996 Austria	

Martin Edward McInnis (born June 2, 1970) is an American former ice hockey player who played in the National Hockey League for the New York Islanders, Calgary Flames, Mighty Ducks of Anaheim and the Boston Bruins. An eighth round selection of the Islanders, 163rd overall at the 1988 NHL entry draft, McInnis played three seasons of college hockey with the Boston College Eagles and played with the United States National Team at the 1992 Winter Olympics before turning professional. He scored 170 goals and recorded 420 points in a 12-year professional career and played in two World Championship tournaments where he was a member of the bronze medal-winning American squad in 1996. An inductee of Boston College's Varsity Club Athletic Hall of Fame, McInnis returned to the school in 2013 as an assistant coach.

== Playing career ==
McInnis played two seasons of high school hockey for Milton Academy in Milton, Massachusetts between 1986 and 1988 where he averaged in excess of one point per game. He was selected by the New York Islanders, 163rd overall, at the 1988 NHL entry draft but chose to play college hockey with the Boston College Eagles before embarking on a professional career. McInnis finished third in conference scoring in 1989–90 and tied a Hockey East record with five goals in one game in an 8–5 victory over Merrimack College on March 5, 1990. McInnis recorded 142 points in three seasons at Boston College.

Opting to remain amateur so he could play in the Olympics, McInnis spent the majority of the 1991–92 season with the United States men's national ice hockey team where he recorded 34 points in 54 games. At the 1992 Albertville Olympics, McInnis led the American team in scoring with five goals and two assists in eight games as the United States finished fourth in the tournament. McInnis turned professional following the tournament as he joined the Islanders for 15 games late in the 1991–92 NHL season where he scored three goals and five assists. He made his NHL debut on March 3, 1992, against the Montreal Canadiens and scored his first goal on March 8 against goaltender Tom Draper of the Buffalo Sabres.

After splitting the 1992–93 season between New York and the American Hockey League's Capital District Islanders, McInnis joined New York full-time for 1993–94 and led the Islanders in plus-minus at +31. His totals of 25 goals and 56 points were each the highest he would score in his career. After scoring only 16 points in the lockout-shortened 1994–95 season, McInnis finished third in team scoring with 46 points in 1995–96. Following the NHL season, he joined Team USA for the 1996 World Championship. In seven games, McInnis recorded two assists for the bronze medal-winning Americans. He returned for the 1997 tournament where he scored four points in a sixth-place effort by the United States.

On March 18, 1997, McInnis was traded, along with Tyrone Garner and a draft pick to the Calgary Flames in exchange for Robert Reichel. Combined between the two teams, McInnis finished the 1996–97 season with 23 goals and 49 points in 80 games. He was primarily a checking line forward and penalty killer in his only full season with the Flames, 1998–99. Six games into the 1998–99 season, McInnis was traded twice on the same day. On October 27, 1998, the Flames sent him to the Chicago Blackhawks, along with Erik Andersson and Jamie Allison, in exchange for Jeff Shantz and Steve Dubinsky. He was then immediately sent by Chicago to the Mighty Ducks of Anaheim for a fourth round draft pick. Shortly after the trades, Chicago's general manager, Bob Murray, admitted he regretted trading McInnis so quickly, particularly after McInnis found early success on Anaheim's top scoring line as a replacement for the injured Teemu Selänne. He finished the season with 54 points, and two seasons later, scored 20 goals and 42 points for the Mighty Ducks.

Late in the 2001–02 season, Anaheim sent him to the Boston Bruins in a March 6, 2002, trade in exchange for a third round draft pick. McInnis was excited by the deal as it afforded him the opportunity to play for his hometown team. He finished the season with 28 points in 79 games between the two teams. Following a final NHL season in 2002–03, he retired. McInnis finished his career with 420 points in 796 games.

Boston College inducted McInnis into its Varsity Club Hall of Fame in 2012. He returned to the school in 2013 to serve as a volunteer assistant coach.

== Career statistics ==
=== Regular season and playoffs ===
			Regular season					Playoffs
Season	Team	League	GP	G	A	Pts	PIM	GP	G	A	Pts	PIM
1986–87	Milton Academy	HS-Prep	25	21	19	40	—	—	—	—	—	—
1987–88	Milton Academy	HS-Prep	25	26	25	51	—	—	—	—	—	—
1988–89	Boston College	HE	39	13	19	32	8	—	—	—	—	—
1989–90	Boston College	HE	41	24	29	53	43	—	—	—	—	—
1990–91	Boston College	HE	38	21	36	57	40	—	—	—	—	—
1991–92	United States National Team	Intl	54	15	19	34	20	—	—	—	—	—
1991–92	New York Islanders	NHL	15	3	5	8	0	—	—	—	—	—
1992–93	Capital District Islanders	AHL	10	4	12	16	2	—	—	—	—	—
1992–93	New York Islanders	NHL	56	10	20	30	24	3	0	1	1	0
1993–94	New York Islanders	NHL	81	25	31	56	24	4	0	0	0	0
1994–95	New York Islanders	NHL	41	9	7	16	8	—	—	—	—	—
1995–96	New York Islanders	NHL	74	12	34	46	39	—	—	—	—	—
1996–97	New York Islanders	NHL	70	20	22	42	20	—	—	—	—	—
1996–97	Calgary Flames	NHL	10	3	4	7	2	—	—	—	—	—
1997–98	Calgary Flames	NHL	75	19	25	44	34	—	—	—	—	—
1998–99	Calgary Flames	NHL	6	1	1	2	6	—	—	—	—	—
1998–99	Mighty Ducks of Anaheim	NHL	75	18	34	52	36	4	2	0	2	2
1999–00	Mighty Ducks of Anaheim	NHL	62	10	18	28	26	—	—	—	—	—
2000–01	Mighty Ducks of Anaheim	NHL	75	20	22	42	40	—	—	—	—	—
2001–02	Mighty Ducks of Anaheim	NHL	60	9	14	23	25	—	—	—	—	—
2001–02	Boston Bruins	NHL	19	2	3	5	8	6	0	1	1	0
2002–03	Boston Bruins	NHL	77	9	10	19	38	5	1	0	1	0
NHL totals			796	170	250	420	330	22	3	2	5	4

=== International ===
Year	Team	Event	GP	G	A	Pts	PIM
1992	United States	OLY	8	5	2	7	4
1996	United States	WC	7	0	2	2	4
1997	United States	WC	8	2	2	4	2
International totals			23	7	6	13	10
