= Jen Lee (cartoonist) =

American cartoonist, illustrator, and author

Jen Lee is an American cartoonist, illustrator, and author. Her works include Thunderpaw: In the Ashes of Fire Mountain, Vacancy, Garbage Night, and At the Edge of the Stream at Dusk.

== Personal life ==
Lee grew up in Naples, Florida. She studied illustration at the School of Visual Arts. She was a resident of Twin Falls, Idaho in 2017, but later that year moved to Los Angeles, a move chronicled in her book At the Edge of the Stream at Dusk.

== Career and works ==
Lee created Thunderpaw: In the Ashes of Fire Mountain, an animated webcomic. The comic started in August 2012 and was released gradually online. The story follows two dogs, Bruno and Ollie, who after some apocalyptic event try to make their way home.

Lee's comic Vacancy was published in 2015. Published by Nobrow Press, the 24 page book follows a dog Simon who decides to become a wild animal after all humans have vanished.

In 2017, Lee published a longer follow-up to Vacancy entitled Garbage Night, also through Nobrow. The comic follows the same characters and setting.

In 2019, Lee published At the Edge of the Stream at Dusk, a memoir about her move to Los Angeles to a new job, after a breakup. The comic, in which the people are drawn as anthropomorphic animals, was published by ShortBox.

Lee has also worked as a freelance illustrator.

== Reception ==
Several reviewers have praised Lee's work. A reviewer for Bleeding Cool described Thunderpaw as "A unique beast that could only work in it's [sic] native online environment... Constantly glitching and twitching with a frantic energy... As well as perfectly portraying her two main characters as hyperactive, jittery puppies it also gives her world a restless and unnerving quality to it" and added "I'd give up all my [paper] trades in an instant for more quirky gems like this." A review for Gizmodo's site Io9 said "Lee makes great use of her digital canvas to convey both the emotions of her canine protagonists and the devastation around them", and a reviewer for Comic Book Resources said: "The color palette seems vintage and dusty, recalling communist propaganda posters from the '40s and '50s. The style, however, is more modern. Although far more polished, Thunderpaw recalls the graffiti-like art styles that made its mark on the black-and-white comics of the '80s and '90s."
