= If You Don't Buy This Book, We'll Kill This Dog! =

Book by Matty Simmons

If You Don't Buy This Book, We'll Kill This Dog: Life, Laughs, Love and Death at National Lampoon
- Author: Matty Simmons
- Language: English
- Genre: Nonfiction
- Publisher: Barricade Books
- Publication date: 1994
- Publication place: United States
- Media type: Print
- Pages: 335
- ISBN: 978-1569800027
- OCLC: 29637682

If You Don't Buy This Book, We'll Kill This Dog: Life, Laughs, Love, and Death at National Lampoon is an American book that was published in 1994. It is a history based on the author Matty Simmons' involvement with National Lampoon magazine and its various spin-offs, including the film Animal House. (The title of the book is a reference to an infamous 1973 National Lampoon cover featuring a dog looking worriedly at the muzzle of a revolver pressed to its head, with the caption: "If You Don't Buy This Magazine, We'll Kill This Dog".)

Dating back to National Lampoon's debut in 1970, Simmons was the chairman of Twenty First Century Communications, Inc., of which the original National Lampoon, Inc. was created as a subsidiary company. From 1976 to 1977, Simmons was the publisher of the magazine, and from 1978 for a period of time, he was the publishing director. Simmons's film credits included being the producer of National Lampoon's Animal House and the National Lampoon's Vacation film series.

The book "covers National Lampoon's turbulent editorial periods of fluctuating staff and private vendettas, its haphazard film projects..., its recurrent controversy — from libel suits by Walt Disney and Liza Minnelli to advertising and newsstand boycotts spurred by guardians of public morality — and finally its disastrous takeover in the late '80s by a group led by one of the actors from Animal House."
