= Michael Colton =

American screenwriter

- Education: Harvard University
- Occupations: Journalist; screenwriter
- Spouse: Carla Pereira

Michael Colton is an American screenwriter and former journalist. With writing partner John Aboud, he created the television show Home Economics and wrote the films A Futile and Stupid Gesture and Penguins of Madagascar. He was a regular commentator on Best Week Ever and other VH1 shows, including I Love the '80s.

== Personal life ==
Colton attended Newton North High School in Massachusetts, where he wrote a humor column for the student newspaper. He graduated from Harvard University, where he was an editor at both the Harvard Lampoon and The Harvard Crimson.

He married lawyer and Harvard alum Carla Pereira on May 30, 2004.

== Career ==
Colton has co-written the films A Futile and Stupid Gesture, Penguins of Madagascar and The Comebacks. He has also co-produced the television series Close Enough and Zoolander: Super Model and written for Childrens Hospital and Leverage. In 2021, he co-created the ABC television series Home Economics.

In the late 1990s, Colton was a journalist at The Washington Post. He has also written for The New York Times Magazine, the Los Angeles Times, The Boston Globe, Newsweek, The New York Observer, the Washington City Paper, Brill's Content, and McSweeney's.

During the Writers Guild of America strike of 2007–2008, Colton and Aboud created the website AMPTP.com, a parody of the Alliance of Motion Picture and Television Producers' official website, AMPTP.org.

From 2000 to 2003, Colton and Aboud ran Modern Humorist, an entertainment company based in Brooklyn, best known for its online magazine.

== Filmography ==
=== Television ===
Year	Title	Role
2003	VH1 Big in 03	Consultant
2004	The Wrong Coast	Writer
2004	I Love the '90s	Himself/Panelist
2005	Last Laugh '05	Consultant
2005	CMT: 20 Merriest Christmas Videos	Himself
2005	I Love the '90s: Part Deux	Himself
2005	I Love the '80s 3-D	Himself
2005	I Love the Holidays	Himself
2006	I Love Toys	Himself
2006	I Love the 70s: Volume 2	Himself
2008	I Love the New Millennium	Himself
2008	Best Week Ever with Paul F. Tompkins	Himself
2009	Sit Down, Shut Up	Executive Story Editor, Writer
2009	Black to the Future	Himself
2009	The Great Debate	Himself
2009	100 Most Shocking Music Moments	Himself
2010	Leverage	Executive Story Editor, Writer
2010	A Night of 140 Tweets: A Celebrity Tweet-A-Thon for Haiti	Himself
2010	Undateable	Himself
2011	Allen Gregory	Writer, Co-Producer
2014	I Love the 2000s	Himself
2014	Newsreaders	Writer
2015	Childrens Hospital	Writer
2016	Zoolander: Super Model	Writer, Producer
2017	The Fake News With Ted Nelms	Writer
2020	Close Enough	Executive Producer
2021	Jeopardy!	Contestant
2021	Acapulco	Writer
2021	Home Economics	Co-creator, Writer, Executive Producer

=== Movies ===
Year	Title	Role
2007	The Comebacks	Writer
2014	Penguins of Madagascar	Writer
2018	A Futile and Stupid Gesture	Writer, Executive Producer
