= Josh Karp =

American journalist and author

- Born: October 22, 1966 (age 59)
- Occupations: Journalist; author
- Spouse: Susan
- Children: 4

Josh Karp (born October 22, 1966) is an American journalist and author. He lives in suburban Chicago, Illinois, with his wife, Susan, and their four sons.

A journalist, writer and film producer. His first book, A Futile and Stupid Gesture, won best biography at both the Independent Publisher Book Awards and Midwest Book Awards in 2006. It was adapted into a film of the same name, starring Will Forte, for Netflix in 2018. He is also the author of Straight Down the Middle: Shivas Irons, Bagger Vance and How I Learned to Stop Worrying and Love My Golf Swing and Orson Welles's Last Movie: The Making of The Other Side of the Wind.

Karp served as moderator of a panel discussion on The Other Side of the Wind at the 21st annual Sedona International Film Festival in Sedona, Arizona, in February 2015.

He was a producer on the Morgan Neville documentary, They'll Love Me When I'm Dead, which premiered at the Venice Film Festival in August 2018.

Karp's writing has appeared in Salon, Vanity Fair, The Los Angeles Times, The Chicago Sun-Times and Newsweek, among others.
