= John Aboud =

American writer and comedian

John Aboud III is an American writer and comedian. With Michael Colton, he was a regular commentator on Best Week Ever and other VH1 shows. From 2000 to 2003, the two founded Modern Humorist, a parody website based in Brooklyn, New York.

In 2022, he and Colton signed a scripted television development deal with Lionsgate Television.

== Early life and career ==
Aboud graduated from Douglas S. Freeman High School in suburban Richmond, Virginia. He graduated from Harvard University in 1995, where he was an editor of the Harvard Lampoon and served as president in 1994. Prior to the creation of Modern Humorist, Aboud worked as a freelance writer for magazines and websites. In 1996, he was among the first copywriters at Grey Advertising's online division.

== Personal life ==
In May 2000, Aboud married Molly Bridget Confer, the deputy editor of Teen People Online.

== Filmography ==
| Year | Title | Role | |
|---|---|---|---|
| 2014 | Penguins of Madagascar | Writer | |
| 2015 | Childrens Hospital | Writer | 3 episodes |
| 2018 | A Futile and Stupid Gesture | Writer | |
| 2021-2022 | Close Enough | Writer | 14 episodes |
| 2021-2023 | Home Economics | Creator and Writer | 41 episodes |
