= Milton Academy =

Prep school in Milton, Massachusetts, US

Location
- 170 Centre Street; Milton, Massachusetts 02186; United States

Information
- Type: Independent, boarding and day
- Motto: Dare to be True
- Established: 1798; 228 years ago
- Head of School: Alixe Callen '88
- Faculty: 127 (Upper School)
- Grades: 9–12 (Upper School); K–8 (Lower School)
- Enrollment: 717 (Upper School)
- Campus size: 125 acres (0.51 km^{2})
- Campus type: Suburban
- Colors: Orange and Blue
- Song: Jerusalem
- Athletics: 25 interscholastic sports
- Athletics conference: Independent School League
- Team name: Mustangs
- Rival: Noble and Greenough
- Alumni: List of Milton Academy alumni
- Website: milton.edu

Milton Academy (informally referred to as Milton) is a co-educational, independent, and college-preparatory boarding and day school in Milton, Massachusetts, educating students in grades K–12. The Lower School (grades K–8) educates day students and the Upper School (grades 9–12) educates a roughly even mixture of boarding and day students.

Milton's list of notable alumni includes Nobel laureate T. S. Eliot, Attorney General Robert F. Kennedy, U.S. Senator Ted Kennedy, Illinois Governor JB Pritzker, and Massachusetts Governor Deval Patrick.

== History ==
=== Early years ===
Milton Academy was founded by Edward Hutchinson Robbins, the speaker of the Massachusetts House of Representatives, after the General Court of Massachusetts set up a committee to study options for secondary education for residents of Norfolk County. Although the committee considered putting the academy in Braintree, Roxbury, Quincy, Dorchester, and Milton, it chose Milton; Speaker Robbins was a Milton resident. Other founding members of the board of trustees included Fisher Ames, Nathanel Emmons, Thaddeus Mason Harris, Joseph McKean, and Ebenezer Thayer.

According to the official town history, the early Milton Academy, like many other old New England academies, was initially "a state-chartered and partially subsidized institution which, in effect, served as a county high school." In March 1798, the Massachusetts legislature granted the academy a corporate charter and a state-funded endowment (three square miles of land in Maine). However, the academy did not actually open for business until 1807, due to protracted disputes about whether the campus should be located in the center or outskirts of town. In 1807, the academy opened in the center of town with 23 students. Most students were locals, although some out-of-town students boarded with local families.

Few records of the early academy survive. Alumni of the early academy include Major General Edwin Vose Sumner, who commanded Union troops at Antietam and Fredericksburg.

In 1866, the town of Milton effectively bought out the first Milton Academy. It opened Milton High School, a tax-funded, tuition-free public school, and hired the academy's principal to lead it. In response, the academy's board of trustees shut down the academy and sold the campus to the public school. From 1866 to 1884, Milton Academy survived as a paper entity, with a board of trustees but no teachers, students, or campus.

=== Refounding as college-preparatory private school ===
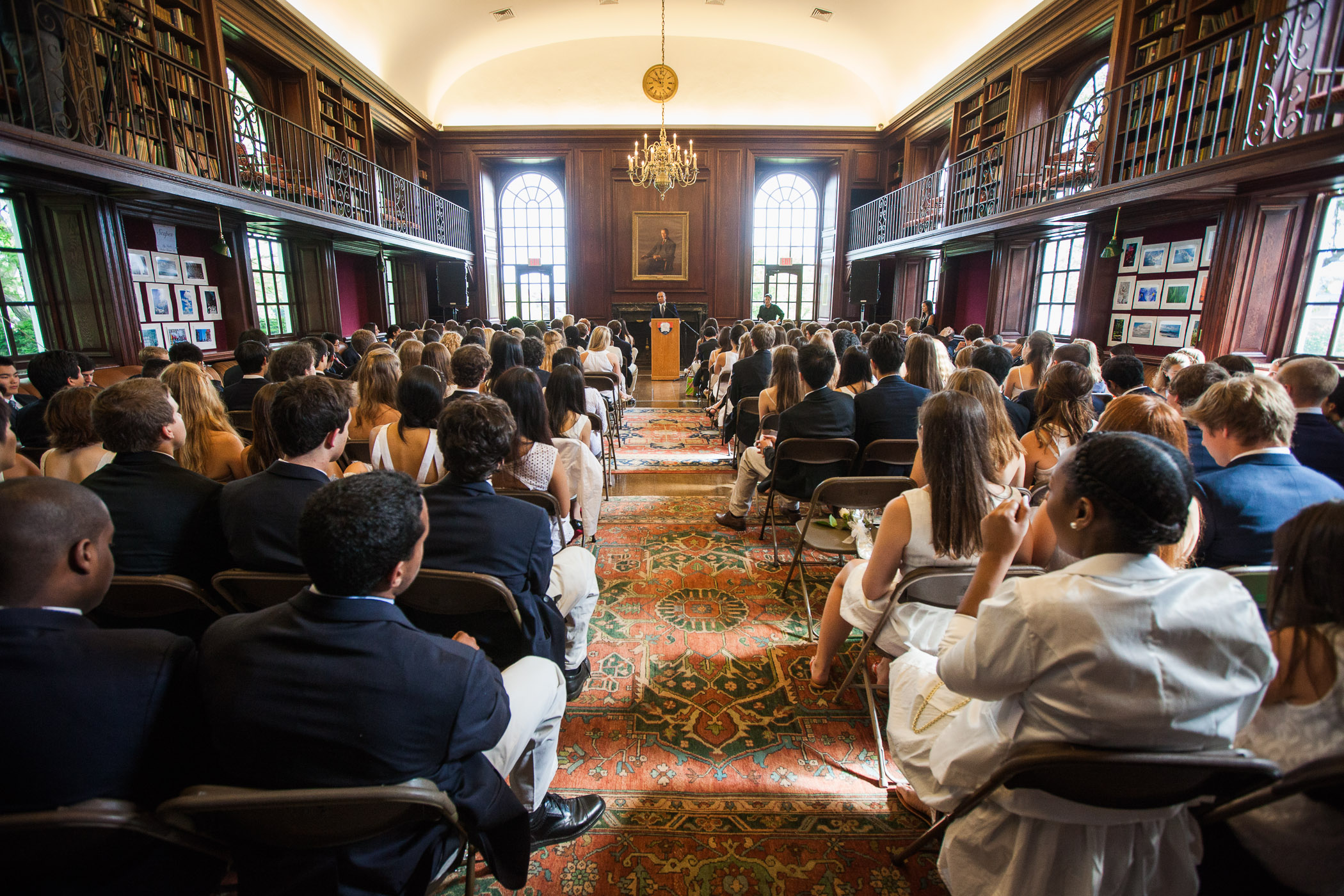
Students hearing Massachusetts Governor Deval Patrick '74 speak at the school in 2012. Patrick delivered the commencement address that year.

In 1879, at the urging of Harvard president Charles Eliot, Milton Academy's board began preparations to re-establish the academy as a fully private school. This was accomplished in 1884, when Milton resident and railroad magnate John Murray Forbes re-established Milton Academy on a new 125-acre site. The academy claims the history of the 1798 institution, and celebrated its 150th anniversary in 1948.

Milton Academy re-opened in September 1885 with four teachers and roughly 40 day students. John Forbes' son William H. Forbes (president of Bell Telephone Company, the predecessor of AT&T) was elected president of the board of trustees. The academy reopened its boarding department in 1888. Although Milton originally educated both boys and girls, in 1901 the Upper School divided into boys' and girls' divisions, each with its own faculty and campus. The boys' and girls' schools reunited in 1981.

The new Milton attracted an affluent clientele and became a notable college-preparatory institution. From 1906 to 1915, Milton sent 179 students to Harvard College, making it Harvard's fifth-largest feeder school, after Boston Latin, Phillips Exeter, Cambridge Latin, and Nobles. In 1996, 33% of Milton graduates went on to Ivy League colleges, second-highest among New England boarding schools. From 2021 to 2023 however, only 14% of Milton graduates landed at Ivy League schools In 2002, Harvard's student newspaper reported that in some years Milton has produced as many as 25% of the students admitted to Harvard through the so-called "Z-list", a set of students who are promised admission to Harvard after taking a gap year; students on the Z-list often have legacy connections to Harvard.

Although Milton was nonsectarian, it traditionally educated large numbers of Unitarian students, in contrast to the many Protestant Episcopalian boarding schools founded at the turn of the 20th century. (In the nineteenth century, the town of Milton was one of the few towns in Massachusetts where Unitarians may have outnumbered trinitarians.) Unitarian Miltonians include poet T. S. Eliot (who later converted to Episcopalianism) and architect Buckminster Fuller. In 1901, several Milton friends and alumni (including William Forbes's son Cameron and Milton trustee Norwood Penrose Hallowell) helped establish Middlesex School, another formally nonsectarian prep school with a large and wealthy Unitarian clientele. Some prominent Catholics were also drawn to Milton's relative lack of Protestant influence. Robert F. Kennedy attended Milton after Rose Kennedy withdrew him from St. Paul's (due to what she believed was SPS' anti-Catholic atmosphere), and his brother Ted also went to Milton.

In November 1948, T. S. Eliot '06 visited Milton to give a lecture to the students; during this visit, he learned that he had won the Nobel Prize. Academic Richard Livingstone spoke at Milton's 150th anniversary celebration; his talk was published, in abridged form, in the November issue of The Atlantic Monthly. Other notable guest speakers include Scottish statesman John Buchan, the politicians Newton D. Baker, Bill Clinton. and Franklin D. Roosevelt, and the diplomat Sumner Welles.

=== Recent years ===
In 1984, Milton purchased the Mountain School, a 418-acre campus and working farm in Vershire, Vermont. Milton operates the Mountain School of Milton Academy as a semester-long program for high school students from around the country. In 2022, author and educator Alex Myers was appointed as director of the program.

In 1991, Milton appointed Needham High School president Edwin P. Fredie as headmaster. According to The New York Times, this made Milton "the first major American boarding school with a black headmaster." Fredie served until 1999 and was succeeded by Milton's first female headmaster, Robin Robertson, who served until 2007.

From 2015 to 2020, Milton conducted a $182 million fundraising campaign, which included $48 million for student financial aid and funded upgrades to Milton's science, art, drama, and athletic facilities.

== Admissions and student body ==
=== Admissions ===
In the 2022–23 school year, Milton's Upper School accepted 13% of applicants for approximately 140 openings. Graduates of the Lower School are automatically accepted to the Upper School.

In a typical year, the Upper School enrolls 100 freshmen, 25 incoming sophomores, and 15 incoming juniors. The Lower School enrolls 24 kindergarteners, 8 incoming fourth-graders, 13 incoming sixth-graders, and 10 incoming seventh-graders.

=== Composition ===
In the 2023–24 school year, the Upper School educated 717 students, of whom 316 (45%) were boarders. 52% of Upper Schoolers identified as students of color. Milton has an unusually small contingent of American boarding students by New England prep school standards, as boarders are a minority of the student body and just under half of Milton's boarders (19%) are international students.

In the 2021–22 school year, the Lower School educated 317 students.

== Finances ==
=== Tuition and financial aid ===
In the 2023–24 school year, Milton's Upper School charged boarding students $73,950 and day students $63,950. 35% of students were on financial aid, and the average financial aid grant covered 75% of tuition.

In the same year, tuition at the Lower School ranged from $42,950 for kindergarteners to $62,550 for middle schoolers.

=== Endowment and expenses ===
Milton's financial endowment stood at $408 million as of June 30, 2021. In its Internal Revenue Service filings for the 2021–22 school year, Milton reported total assets of $483.5 million, net assets of $411.8 million, investment holdings of $394.2 million, and cash holdings of $7.8 million. Milton also reported $65.4 million in program service expenses and $16.2 million in grants (primarily student financial aid).

== Athletics ==
=== Overview ===
Milton offers 15 interscholastic sports for both boys and girls each, as well as seven intramural teams. Its athletic teams compete in the Independent School League and the New England Schools Sailing Association division of the Interscholastic Sailing Association.

Milton's athletics rival is the Noble and Greenough School of Dedham (colloquially "Nobles"). The two schools began playing an annual football game in 1886, and contest the fifth-oldest high school football rivalry in the United States. In 2020, Milton and Nobles were the two largest feeders to Harvard's varsity athletic teams; Milton supplied nine Harvard athletes and Nobles supplied fifteen.

=== Notable teams ===
- Tennis. From 1998 to 2004, Herb Chennel's boys' tennis team went 74-1 and captured six ISL championships and six New England championships. More than 10 players from those teams went on to Division I tennis careers.
- Sailing. The coed sailing team won two national championships in 1998 and 2002—one in team racing and one in fleet racing. It also won the team racing world championship in 2015.
- Hockey. Milton's boys' hockey team has had several players go on to successful professional careers, most notably 12-year NHLer Marty McInnis and 2023 Calder Memorial Trophy winner Matty Beniers. In 2011, the Milton boys' hockey team won the New England Preparatory School Athletic Council (NEPSAC) championship; it also finished second in 2016.

== Sexual assaults ==
In February 2017, the academy announced the results of a nine-month sexual misconduct investigation by T&M Protection Resources. The firm interviewed 60 alumni, parents, current and former staff and came to the conclusion that four former employees had engaged in illegal sexual conduct with students in the 1970s and 80s. The most egregious abuse came from a drama teacher named Reynold Buono who had abused at least 12 male students between 1975 and 1987, when Milton fired him. After extradition from Thailand, Buono was indicted by the Norfolk County District Attorney. Following an appeal to the Massachusetts Supreme Judicial Court, Buono pleaded guilty to two counts of rape of a child with force in 2022.

In 2005, the school expelled five members of the boys' varsity ice hockey team for obtaining oral sex from a 15-year-old female student on three occasions. Following an investigation by the Norfolk County District Attorney, all five expelled students were indicted for statutory rape. The DA dropped the charges against the three older students in exchange for an apology, 100 hours of community service, and two years of probation. (The two younger students were indicted in juvenile court, where fewer details are disclosed to the public.) The female student was placed on administrative leave and eventually transferred to a different school. One of the expelled students later sued the academy, but his suit was dismissed in 2007. Two Milton graduates used this story as the inspiration for a book, which was later adapted into a movie.
