= The Beatles: The Authorised Biography =

Authorised biography of the Beatles by Hunter Davies

- Cover of the original US edition
- Author: Hunter Davies
- Language: English
- Subject: The Beatles
- Genre: Authorised biography
- Publisher: Heinemann (UK), McGraw-Hill (US)
- Publication date: 17 August 1968
- Media type: Hardback; later paperback

The Beatles: The Authorised Biography is a book written by the British author Hunter Davies and published by Heinemann in the UK in September 1968. It was written with the full cooperation of the Beatles and chronicles the band's career up until early 1968, two years before their break-up. It was the only authorised biography of the Beatles written during their career. Davies published revised editions of the book in 1978, 1982, 1985, 2002, 2009, and 2018.

== Background ==
In 1966, Hunter Davies was working as the Atticus columnist for the Sunday Times newspaper and had written two books, one of which was the novel Here We Go Round the Mulberry Bush. Moved by the Beatles' song "Eleanor Rigby", he visited Paul McCartney at his house in St John's Wood, in September 1966, intending to make the song the focus of his newspaper column. At a subsequent meeting at the house, Davies hoped to persuade McCartney to write the theme song for the film adaptation of Here We Go Round the Mulberry Bush. Nothing came of this idea, but the pair began discussing the possibility of an official biography of the Beatles. Recalling their conversation in 2002, Davies said that there had been just two previous books about the band, "both paperbacks, neither substantial", and he suggested to McCartney that the publication of an official history would save the Beatles having to answer many of the usual questions put to them by the media.

Through McCartney's introduction, Davies met with Brian Epstein, the Beatles' manager. Epstein promised Davies full access to the band members and exclusivity over any other writers wishing to write a similar biography for the next two years. Signed on 25 January 1967, their contract stipulated that the Beatles had the right to make changes to the submitted manuscript. The London-based publisher Heinemann agreed an advance on the manuscript of £3000 (equivalent to £47,802 in 2025), which was divided between the author and Nemperor Holdings, a company of Epstein's. (Note: Davies also gave the Beatles and Epstein a third of his author's royalties.) Davies recalled that the advance was "nothing startling", and he was surprised at the lack of excitement about the book in the publishing industry. One of the Heinemann directors told him that "the Beatles bubble would soon burst", which was a widely held viewpoint at the time. (Note: The Beatles had announced their retirement from live performance in November 1966, to focus on studio recording, and had failed to release any new music for the Christmas period that year. Stories had circulated in the press that the band were due to break up, and Epstein feared that their enormous popularity might be coming to an end.)

== Writing and content ==
According to Davies, he spent much of the next six months researching the Beatles' story, travelling to Liverpool, Hamburg and New York. He said that verifiable information about the group's years on the club circuit in Hamburg in the early 1960s was hard to come by, and none of the Beatles were able to remember much or even agree on how many times they went to Hamburg. The lack of archived information and faulty memories of McCartney and John Lennon led to Davies giving the wrong year for the pair's first meeting, which took place at a Woolton church fete in July 1957. Davies said that one of the most interesting aspects of his research was meeting the Beatles' parents, who, as a result of the band's fame since 1963, "had been uprooted from their homes, from their cultural and social roots, and didn't quite know what had happened to their sons, or themselves". He also interviewed the Beatles' school friends and teachers, as well as associates from their musical career.

Davies says that when he was with individual members of the band he wrote down their comments in his notebook, but when they were all together, he simply observed and then wrote about the occasion once he had returned home. Davies attended songwriting sessions at the Beatles' homes and some of the recording sessions for their 1967 album Sgt. Pepper's Lonely Hearts Club Band, which he recounted in detail in the book. With the Beatles' permission, he would retrieve their discarded handwritten lyric sheets at the end of the sessions. He was among the crowd of friends who joined the band for their performance of "All You Need Is Love" on the Our World satellite broadcast, on 25 June 1967, and accompanied them to the Transcendental Meditation seminar they attended in Bangor in late August. He was present also for some of the filming of Magical Mystery Tour, the project that McCartney initiated as a means to rally the band in the wake of Epstein's death during their stay in Bangor.

Davies carried out interviews at home with the band members and their wives or girlfriends, presenting a picture of normality in their domestic lives. The Beatles, particularly Lennon, were eager to downplay their artistry and influence, and Davies' narrative similarly dismisses Beatlemania as a journalistic fad. The unity among the four band members, to the partial exclusion of their romantic partners, was a message that was consistently put forward by his interviewees. He quoted McCartney as saying: "The thing is, we're all really the same person … If one of us, one side of the Mates, leans over one way we all go with him or we pull him back." When Lennon's wife, Cynthia, expressed a long-held wish to go on holiday with just her husband and their son Julian, Lennon asked, "Not even with our Beatle buddies?" – to which Cynthia replied: "They seem to need you less than you need them."

The book also includes a passage describing Lennon at home one evening, smoking marijuana with a family friend. George Harrison recounts his first experience with the hallucinogenic drug LSD, in early 1965, saying: "It was as if I'd never tasted, talked, seen, thought or heard properly before." Jane Asher, McCartney's fiancée, admitted to feeling left out of his LSD experiences but trying to accommodate his new interests, while McCartney admitted to having tried to make Asher abandon her successful career as an actress. Davies completed all the interviews for the book by January 1968.

== Requested alterations ==
After submitting his manuscript for approval by the Beatles and their families, Davies was required to make several alterations. In Beatles aide Peter Brown's later description, this process amounted to the "wholesale censorship" of the manuscript, particularly with regard to the band's drug taking. According to Davies, however, the Beatles made relatively few demands. He says it was his own decision to leave out any mention of the band's exploits with groupies during their touring years. He says that this was out of consideration for the band members' partners, and because: "Most people over the age of 25 in the 1960s were aware of what happened between rock stars and groupies. I felt no need to go into it."

Since the Beatles had become fascinated by meditation, and at that time planned to focus on spirituality at the expense of their careers, Harrison asked him to include more information on this aspect. Pattie Boyd, Harrison's wife, explains in the book: "He's found something stronger than the Beatles, though he still wants them to share it." Davies was also pressed by Lennon to present a more wholesome picture of his childhood and to cut some of the profanity – to placate Lennon's aunt and parental guardian, Mimi Smith. (Note: During the proofreading stage, Lennon wrote to Davies requesting that a remark he made about his mother Julia and her common-law spouse, John Dykins, be removed. He further requested that Davies share the book with Smith before it was published.) In addition, Epstein's family asked that some mentions of Epstein's homosexuality be cut from the manuscript, although he had approved the text in question. Davies recalled that he was careful to use the term "gay", which was "still a code word" at the time.

== Publication ==
In Britain, Heinemann published the book on 30 September 1968. McGraw-Hill acquired the US rights for $160,000 (equivalent to $1.48 million in 2025), having outbid eight other major publishing houses. McGraw-Hill decided to release copies there on 17 August to avoid losing out to a rival biography by Julius Fast, titled The Beatles: The Real Story. Signet rush-released another book titled The Beatles, written by Anthony Scaduto, in an attempt to take sales from Davies' book. In the UK and the US, the cover of The Beatles: The Authorised Biography featured a composite photo of a human head made up of quadrants containing a portion of each of the Beatles' faces. Excerpts from the book appeared in The Sunday Times and in the US magazine Life.

The publication coincided with the cinema run of the Beatles' Yellow Submarine animated film and the release of "Hey Jude", the group's first single on their Apple record label. The book furthered the theme of togetherness presented by these projects. Author Jonathan Gould comments that, on this issue, the biography was already considerably out of date, given the malaise afflicting the band after their return from India, and the fact that Lennon had left Cynthia for Japanese artist Yoko Ono, just as McCartney's long-term relationship with Asher had ended. (Note: Ono and her experimental film Bottoms had been the subject of one of Davies' Atticus columns in February 1967, under the title "Oh No, Ono".) In addition, Ringo Starr had temporarily left the group in August, having grown tired of the bad atmosphere and McCartney's criticism of his drumming. In an interview he gave in early December to Keele University's Unit arts magazine, Lennon recanted his statement that the Beatles' success was not a matter of talent or artistry, acknowledging that "It was only last year since we were talking to Hunter Davies. I've changed that much since then." Lennon also said that some of his views were "how I felt that day" when speaking to Davies, but the book was "nothing to do with what were are [now]".

The availability of the book proved beneficial to American business manager Allen Klein in his long-held quest to secure the Beatles as his clients. Before meeting with Lennon and Ono in January 1969 to discuss a solution to Apple's financial problems, Klein used the book to glean a picture of Lennon's self-image and develop an argument that convinced him to place his trust in Klein.

=== Revised editions ===
The Beatles has been revised and updated several times, starting in 1978. In the 1982 edition, Davies included a report of a telephone conversation he had with McCartney in June 1981, six months after Lennon's murder. In an outpouring that Beatles historian Erin Torkelson Weber recognises as uncharacteristically open for the singer, McCartney complained about the media's portrayal of him as inferior to Lennon, a depiction that had been enforced by the success of Philip Norman's acclaimed Beatles biography, Shout! McCartney also shared his hurt at comments made by Ringo Starr, Neil Aspinall and Cilla Black, at Starr's recent wedding, that appeared to underline others' impression of him as an insincere person. McCartney was disappointed that Davies chose to write about the conversation, which he thought was a private discussion.

The 1985 edition of the book featured a brief postscript covering more recent events. It also included further examples of what Davies described as the "strange conversations" he had with McCartney, who presented arguments that questioned the validity of his past friendship with Lennon. For the 2002 edition, published by Cassels, Davies added an introductory essay on the book's creation and more photographs. For the 40th anniversary edition, he updated the introduction to cover Harrison's death and McCartney's failed marriage to Heather Mills.

== Reception ==
According to Davies, the authorised history was initially viewed as "quite daring and revealing", particularly in the US, and to quote the Beatles using the word "fuck" was "most unusual in a popular book at the time". (Note: Davies wrote in 2007: "When it came out, in 1968, it was seen as brutally honest. Hard to believe now, but at the time biographies of popular heroes revealed no warts. The word 'fuck' was used and taking LSD admitted. Daring, huh?") Jonathan Gould considers it to be a worthy account of the band's history. He says that, aside from its few factual errors, the book deserves its status as an authoritative source for subsequent Beatles biographies.

In his December 1970 Rolling Stone interview (subsequently published as the book Lennon Remembers), John Lennon was scathing in his assessment of Davies' work, along with many aspects of what he termed the Beatles "myth". He complained that the authorised biography was part of the sanitising of the Beatles' public image, when in reality their history comprised Satyricon-like orgies on tour, heavy LSD usage by himself and Harrison, and humiliating artistic compromises throughout the Beatlemania era. Authors and biographers were subsequently divided in their view of the book's accuracy; Weber writes that, as a result of the alternative "narratives" represented by Lennon Remembers and then Shout!, both of which challenged the "Fab Four" narrative, Davies' book was "tainted by association". According to Bob Spitz, McCartney told him that the Beatles had agreed to provide the media with "a version of the facts" when they first became famous, and Davies' account was "65 percent" correct. For his part, Davies has often defended The Beatles as an accurate history, with only Mimi Smith's changes representing a serious compromise.

In his review for Rough Guides, Chris Ingham says that, due to its taming down of the band's drug use and Lennon and Epstein's personal lives, the book's "reputation suffered for a while" once more lurid accounts became available. (Note: Among these were Brown's memoir The Love You Make and Albert Goldman's The Lives of John Lennon. In a televised debate with Davies in 1989, Goldman ridiculed The Beatles, saying that it had no credibility as a historical record.) He describes The Beatles as "full of riveting, first-hand stuff" and adds that Davies provides a "fascinating essay" in the 2002 revised edition. Writing in the New Statesman in 2012, Davies said he was hurt at the time by Lennon's dismissal of the book as "bullshit", and that he was still being asked to respond to Lennon's critique over 40 years later.

Davies' official history remained the only authorised book about the Beatles' career until Harrison's 1980 autobiography, I, Me, Mine, and McCartney's authorised biography, Many Years from Now, written by Barry Miles and published in 1997. Miles, who says he regularly used The Beatles as a reference work for Many Years from Now, describes it as "censored at the time" but still "the most accurate account of their career". In 2016, Colin Fleming of Rolling Stone placed The Beatles sixth in his list of the "10 Best Beatles Books". Fleming admired the book's candour, saying: "clearly these were guys who needed to unburden themselves of some truths they'd been toting around for the bulk of a decade, and they pile up here." In a 2012 article titled "The best books on the Beatles", for The Guardian, John Harris recognised Davies' biography as one of "only two Beatles books of any quality" at the time that Lennon made his comments in Rolling Stone. Harris described it as "admirably researched and brimming with access – but stymied by his artless prose, and the constraints of being the band's in-house writer".

== Sources ==
- Brown, Peter; Gaines, Steven (2002) [1983]. The Love You Make: An Insider's Story of the Beatles. New York, NY: New American Library. ISBN 978-0-4512-0735-7.
- Clayson, Alan (2003). Ringo Starr. London: Sanctuary. ISBN 1-86074-488-5.
- Davies, Hunter, ed. (2013). The John Lennon Letters. London: Phoenix. ISBN 978-1-78022-087-1.
- Doggett, Peter (2011). You Never Give Me Your Money: The Beatles After the Breakup. New York, NY: It Books. ISBN 978-0-06-177418-8.
- Gould, Jonathan (2007). Can't Buy Me Love: The Beatles, Britain, and America. New York, NY: Harmony Books. ISBN 978-0-307-35337-5.
- Greene, Joshua M. (2006). Here Comes the Sun: The Spiritual and Musical Journey of George Harrison. Hoboken, NJ: John Wiley & Sons. ISBN 978-0-470-12780-3.
- Hertsgaard, Mark (1996). A Day in the Life: The Music and Artistry of the Beatles. London: Pan Books. ISBN 0-330-33891-9.
- Ingham, Chris (2006). The Rough Guide to the Beatles (2nd edn). London: Rough Guides. ISBN 978-1-84836-525-4.
- MacDonald, Ian (1998). Revolution in the Head: The Beatles' Records and the Sixties. London: Pimlico. ISBN 978-0-7126-6697-8.
- Miles, Barry (1997). Paul McCartney: Many Years from Now. New York, NY: Henry Holt and Company. ISBN 0-8050-5249-6.
- Miles, Barry (2001). The Beatles Diary Volume 1: The Beatles Years. London: Omnibus Press. ISBN 0-7119-8308-9.
- Mojo Special Limited Edition: 1000 Days That Shook the World (The Psychedelic Beatles – April 1, 1965 to December 26, 1967). London: Emap. 2002.
- Norman, Philip (2008). John Lennon: The Life. New York, NY: Ecco. ISBN 978-0-06-075402-0.
- Quantick, David (2002). Revolution: The Making of The Beatles' White Album. Chicago, IL: A Cappella Books. ISBN 978-1-55652-470-7.
- Riley, Tim (2011). Lennon: The Man, the Myth, the Music – The Definitive Life. London: Random House. ISBN 978-0-7535-4020-6.
- Schaffner, Nicholas (1978). The Beatles Forever. New York, NY: McGraw-Hill. ISBN 0-07-055087-5.
- Sounes, Howard (2010). Fab: An Intimate Life of Paul McCartney. London: HarperCollins. ISBN 978-0-00-723705-0.
- Spitz, Bob (2005). The Beatles: The Biography. New York, NY: Little, Brown and Company. ISBN 978-0-316-80352-6.
- Tillery, Gary (2010). The Cynical Idealist: A Spiritual Biography of John Lennon. Wheaton, IL: Quest Books. ISBN 978-0-8356-0875-6.
- Turner, Steve (2006). The Gospel According to the Beatles. Louisville, KY: Westminster John Knox Press. ISBN 978-0-664-22983-2.
- Turner, Steve (2016). Beatles '66: The Revolutionary Year. New York, NY: HarperLuxe. ISBN 978-0-06-249713-0.
- Weber, Erin Torkelson (2016). The Beatles and the Historians: An Analysis of Writings About the Fab Four. Jefferson, NC: McFarland. ISBN 978-1-4766-6266-4.
