= Lorren Daro =

American talent agent (1937–2017)

- Daro being interviewed in Beautiful Dreamer: Brian Wilson and the Story of Smile (2004)
- Born: Loren Darro Schwartz; 1937
- Died: 2017 (aged 79–80); Cobb, California, U.S.
- Occupations: Talent agent; actor; author

Lorren Daro (born Loren Darro Schwartz, 1937–2017) was an American talent agent known for his involvement in the Los Angeles music scene in the 1960s. His contacts included Beach Boys member Brian Wilson, session musician Van Dyke Parks, jingle writer Tony Asher, and Byrds members David Crosby, Chris Hillman, and Roger McGuinn.

Daro helped connect Wilson to Asher for the writing of the Beach Boys' album Pet Sounds (1966). He is also infamous for having introduced Wilson to marijuana and LSD; the latter drug is sometimes cited as the cause of Wilson's subsequent mental health struggles. Later in his life, Daro was a tour manager, concert promoter, and author of two self-published books.

== Background ==
Loren Darro Schwartz was born in 1937 and grew up in Beverly Hills, California. As a child, he took on professional acting roles. Early in his life, he formed friendships with David Anderle, a grammar school acquaintance, and Tony Asher, described by Schwartz as "my best pal in college". The latter met Schwartz while they were attending Santa Monica High School. Afterward, Schwartz attended Santa Monica City College and graduated from the University of California, Los Angeles, where he majored in theatre.

During the 1960s, Schwartz was employed with the William Morris Agency – who were also representing the Beach Boys – and resided in an apartment on Harper Avenue in West Hollywood. There, he regularly hosted listening and smoking parties; frequent attendees included Asher, members of the Byrds, the Beach Boys' Brian Wilson, and session musician Van Dyke Parks. Schwartz called his apartment a "Gertrude Stein-styled salon. I had the best pot and happening musicians."

In the 1986 biography Heroes and Villains, author Steven Gaines quotes anonymous sources who described Schwartz as "something of a social manipulator" and a "new-wave Jewish intellectual". Another described the scene of his apartment as "a little like Paris in the days when the impressionist painters met at coffeehouses." The same comparison was made in a later blog post by Schwartz. Academic Dave Carter writes that the gatherings of artists at Schwartz's apartment were not particularly unique for the time and setting.

== Association with Brian Wilson ==
In the mid-1960s, Schwartz met Brian Wilson at a Hollywood studio and subsequently became one of his closest friends. Schwartz claimed to have been first acquainted with Wilson in 1961. In another account, he stated that he was introduced to Wilson by Asher in January 1963, but Wilson said that he was already acquainted with Schwartz prior to meeting Asher. Asher recalled that he would occasionally "see Brian [at Loren's house]—but he never stayed long." He characterized Schwartz and Schwartz's wife, Judy, as having "a great influence on Brian."

I became the villain in this drama. I was the 'Hollywood hipster' who had ruined Brian's life. [...] All I can say in my defense is that it is universally understood that Brian's best work followed in the next two years: Pet Sounds, "Good Vibrations", [...] and Smile, among others.

— Loren Schwartz, 2012

Through Schwartz, Wilson was exposed to a wealth of literature and mystical topics – largely of philosophy and world religions – that Wilson formed a deep fascination with. Schwartz also introduced Wilson to marijuana and hashish in late 1964. (Note: Wilson's 1991 memoir, Wouldn't It Be Nice, states that Schwartz pressured him into trying the drug. Schwartz disputed this account and said that Wilson had begged to be given marijuana. "I feared messing with that febrile mind of his. But ... he said, 'If you don't smoke me up, believe me, it's being offered all the time.' So I gave him his first joint.") Along with Wilson's habitual use of marijuana, the constant fraternizing between Wilson and Schwartz ignited tensions between Wilson and his first wife Marilyn, especially after Schwartz introduced Wilson to LSD. (Note: Schwartz dated Wilson's first LSD trip to 1964, months before Wilson's retirement from concert touring in January 1965. However, this conflicts with other reports which suggest that Wilson first dropped LSD in early 1965. Wilson remembered taking the LSD at his home, but according to Marilyn, he took the drug elsewhere with Schwartz.)

Schwartz recalled that Wilson's dosage was 125 micrograms of "pure Owsley" and that his first experience included "the full-on ego death". Marilyn later said that, to her knowledge, Wilson only took LSD one more time, which was again under Schwartz's supervision. Conversely, Schwartz said that he never supplied LSD to Wilson a second time, going on to characterize Marilyn as a "moronic, bovine wife".

In 1966, Wilson wrote the majority of the Beach Boys' Pet Sounds with Tony Asher. Wilson chose Asher as a collaborator because he had felt that "anybody that hung out with Loren Schwartz was a very brainy guy, a real verbal type person." According to Schwartz, the album track "I Just Wasn't Made for These Times" was written about himself, and the band's single "Good Vibrations" was inspired by his wife Lynda. Author David McGowan and journalist Nick Kent suggests that Van Dyke Parks, who collaborated with Wilson on the aborted album Smile, was introduced to Wilson by Schwartz. Other accounts credit David Crosby with introducing Wilson to Parks.

== Later years ==
According to Daro, he was, at one point, "the highest paid Tour Manager in show business", offering his services to bands such as the Beach Boys, the Who, the Association, Deep Purple, the Troggs, and Three Dog Night. Following the early 1970s, he started "my own agency serving colleges and universities with concert acts." Author Peter Ames Carlin wrote that changed his legal name from Loren Schwartz "for complicated reasons involving Subud numerology and a desire to assimilate into non-Jewish culture". Asher explained that it was "to spiritually balance the number of cyphers in his name [laughs]."

In 1983, Daro entered a partnership with property developer Charles Del Valle to buy the Walker Scott Building in downtown San Diego. After several business ventures in the building had failed, Del Valle left the partnership in the mid-1980s, leaving Daro as the sole owner. The property was purchased by the San Diego City Council in March 1995 for $800,000 – $250,000 of which went to Daro after outstanding property taxes were paid. In 1997, Daro moved to San Francisco where he became a literary agent. During this time he experimented with prasterone in response to chronic fatigue and minor arthritis. Daro reported a positive effect: "This energy feels natural, not like having a lot of coffee or stimulants. My mind is also sharper and my arthritic stiffness is gone".

Since 1999, Daro had resided in Cobb, California. He published The Big Dictionary in 2001, a reference book which listed roughly 5,000 "commonly used words" – culled from an unabridged dictionary of 350,000 words – leaving out "words most people already know" and omitting punctuation markings and usage examples.

In 2004, Daro appeared in David Leaf's documentary Beautiful Dreamer: Brian Wilson and the Story of Smile. He was interviewed for Carlin's 2006 biography of Wilson, Catch a Wave. In the book, Carlin writes, "Brian's drug use would eventually be blamed for much of his subsequent emotional and psychiatric ills. As a result, some consider Schwartz to be a truly dark figure, but, unsurprisingly, he sees things differently." In 2012, a written account from Daro regarding his association with Wilson was published by Everett True's website Collapse Board. In 2015, Parks wrote on Twitter, "I confirm Lorren Daro's account of the 60s: an inconvenient truth, in its candor. Never judge a book by its movie!"

== See also ==
- "California Girls"
- "I Know There's an Answer"

== Bibliography ==
- Carlin, Peter Ames (2006). Catch a Wave: The Rise, Fall, and Redemption of the Beach Boys' Brian Wilson. Rodale. ISBN 978-1-59486-320-2.
- Carter, Dale (2016). "Into the Mystic? The Undergrounding of Brian Wilson, 1964–1967". In Lambert, Philip (ed.). Good Vibrations: Brian Wilson and the Beach Boys in Critical Perspective. University of Michigan Press. ISBN 978-0-472-11995-0.
- Dillon, Mark (2012). Fifty Sides of the Beach Boys: The Songs That Tell Their Story. ECW Press. ISBN 978-1-77090-198-8.
- Kent, Nick (1995). "The Last Beach Movie Revisited: The Life of Brian Wilson". The Dark Stuff: Selected Writings on Rock Music. Da Capo Press. pp. 1–74. ISBN 0306806460.
- Gaines, Steven (1986). Heroes and Villains: The True Story of The Beach Boys. New York: Da Capo Press. ISBN 0306806479.
- Granata, Charles L. (2003). Wouldn't It Be Nice: Brian Wilson and the Making of the Beach Boys' Pet Sounds. A Cappella Books. ISBN 9781556525070.
- McGowan, David (2014). Weird Scenes Inside The Canyon: Laurel Canyon, Covert Ops & The Dark Heart Of The Hippie Dream. SCB Distributors. ISBN 978-1-909394-13-1.
