= The Beatles in Bangor =

Stay by the Beatles in Bangor, Wales to attend a Transcendental Meditation seminar

In late August 1967, the English rock band the Beatles attended a seminar on Transcendental Meditation (TM) held by TM creator Maharishi Mahesh Yogi at Bangor Normal College in Bangor, Wales. The visit attracted international publicity for Transcendental Meditation and presented the 1960s youth movement with an alternative to psychedelic drugs as a means to attaining higher consciousness. The Beatles' endorsement of the technique followed the band's incorporation of Indian musical and philosophical influences in their work, and was initiated by George Harrison's disillusionment with his visit to San Francisco's Haight-Ashbury district in early August.

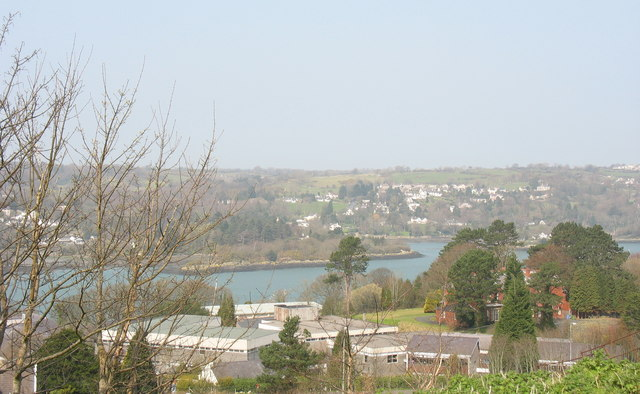
In the foreground is the site of the former Bangor Normal College (now part of the University of Wales, Bangor) where the Maharishi's seminar took place in August 1967

The British press gave the nickname "the Mystical Special" to the train that transported the Beatles from London to Bangor, and some reacted with suspicion to the band's sudden devotion to the Maharishi. The four band members were accompanied by their partners and by fellow artists such as Mick Jagger, Marianne Faithfull and Cilla Black. Two days later, on 27 August, the Beatles learned of the death of their manager, Brian Epstein, and cut their visit short. The four were impressed by the Maharishi's teachings and agreed to join him at his ashram in Rishikesh, India to further their studies in meditation.

== Background and introduction to the Maharishi ==
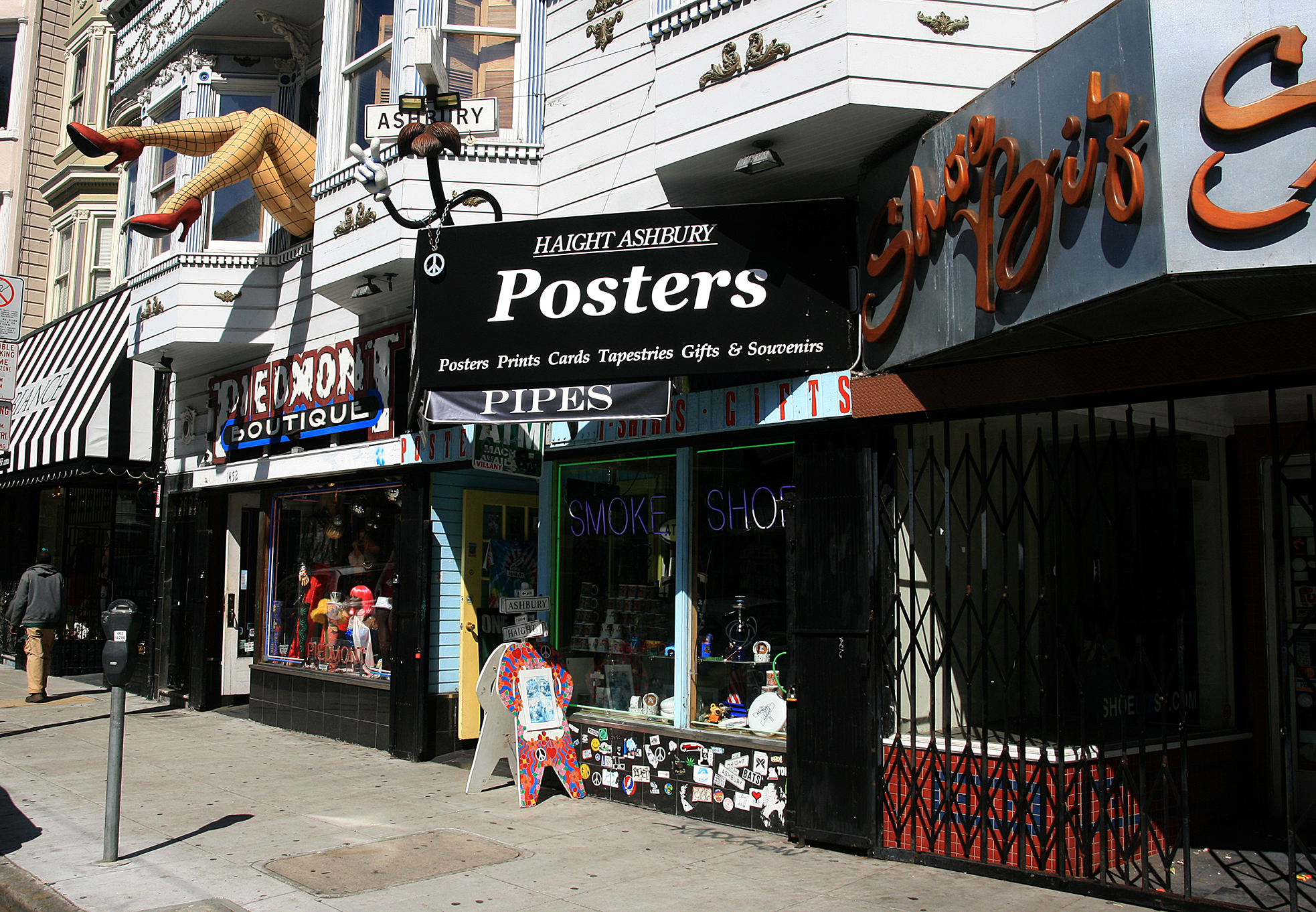
Contemporary shopfronts in Haight-Ashbury. The Beatles came to Transcendental Meditation following Harrison's visit to Haight-Ashbury, then an epicenter of the counterculture, and his disillusionment with the drug culture there.

In the mid-1960s, the Beatles became interested in Indian culture, after the band members, particularly John Lennon and George Harrison, began using the psychedelic drug lysergic acid diethylamide (LSD) in an effort to expand their consciousness. In September and October 1966, Harrison visited India, where, in addition to furthering his sitar studies under Indian classical musician Ravi Shankar, he developed a fascination for Vedic philosophy. Eager to find meaning in the Beatles' worldwide popularity, Harrison and his wife, Pattie Boyd, investigated several options in their search for a guru, or spiritual teacher. According to Boyd, in February 1967, she began attending meetings in London held by the Spiritual Regeneration Movement, an organisation that espoused the Transcendental Meditation technique devised by Maharishi Mahesh Yogi, and she soon shared her discoveries with Harrison. In early August, the couple visited the Haight-Ashbury district of San Francisco, an area that represented the international centre of the hippie counterculture during the Summer of Love. Harrison was dismayed that Haight-Ashbury appeared to be populated primarily by drug addicts and dropouts rather than enlightened members of the counterculture. Mindful of the Beatles' considerable influence on Western youth, particularly after the release of their 1967 album Sgt. Pepper's Lonely Hearts Club Band, Harrison decided to quit taking LSD. On his return to London, he shared his disappointment with Lennon, who had similarly begun to question the benefits of using LSD. (Note: Of all the four Beatles, Lennon and Harrison shared an interest in Hindu philosophy and were dedicated to incorporating utopian ideals into the group's music. Harrison's fully Indian classical-styled "Within You Without You" represented the band's most committed spiritual statement on Sgt. Pepper, and one that Harrison was keen to separate from a drug-inspired "high".)

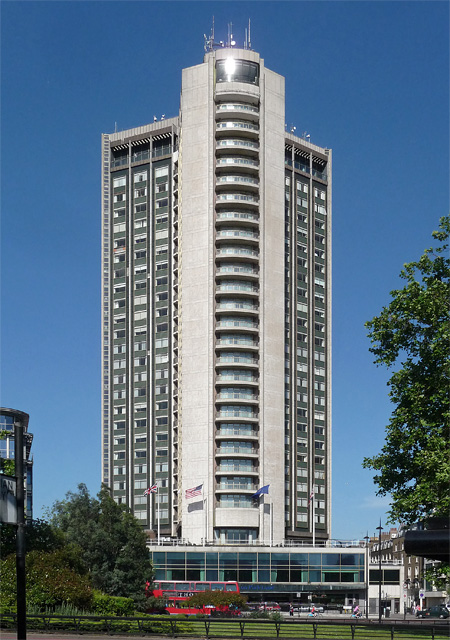
Harrison, Lennon and McCartney first met the Maharishi at the London Hilton, on Park Lane.

The Maharishi was familiar to the Beatles through his appearances on the Granada Television programme People and Places years earlier. Alexis "Magic Alex" Mardas, a friend of the Beatles, had heard a lecture by the Maharishi in Athens; when it was announced that he was to make a public appearance in London later that August, Boyd and Mardas encouraged the Beatles to attend. The London-based sculptor David Wynne has also been credited with the introduction; in Harrison's recollection, it was Wynne who told him about the Maharishi's upcoming visit and recommended that Harrison attend.

On 24 August, Lennon, Harrison and Paul McCartney, together with their respective partners, attended the Maharishi's lecture in the ballroom at the London Hilton on Park Lane. Ringo Starr was not present, due to the recent birth of his and Maureen Starkey's second child, Jason. The Maharishi had announced his intention to retire, so this engagement was expected to be his last in the West. The Beatles were given front row seats and then met the Maharishi in his hotel suite after the lecture. During the meeting, he invited them to be his guests at a ten-day training retreat that was to begin the following day, in Bangor, Gwynedd, Wales. Impressed by the lecture and the Maharishi, the band cancelled a recording session in order to accompany him to Bangor.

== Departure and experience ==
On 25 August, the Beatles travelled by train to Bangor. In their enthusiasm for the Maharishi, the group had invited friends such as Mick Jagger, Jagger's then-partner Marianne Faithfull, Cilla Black, and Harrison's sister-in-law Jenny Boyd. It was the first time for several years that the band had travelled without their manager, Brian Epstein, and their tour managers, and they had not even thought to bring money; Lennon remarked that it was "like going somewhere without your trousers on". The Beatles arrived at London's Euston Station late in the afternoon and were caught up in a large crowd, made worse by the fact that it was the Friday before the August Bank Holiday weekend. They were left to carry their own luggage due to the absence of their assistants and were mobbed on their way to the station platform. Lennon's wife Cynthia became separated from the group and was then held back by police officers who mistook her for a fan. Peter Brown, an executive at Epstein's company NEMS, arranged for Neil Aspinall to drive her to Bangor by car.

The band and their entourage were under constant scrutiny by reporters, photographers and television film crews who dubbed the train "the Mystical Special". During the journey, the Beatles joined the Maharishi in his first class compartment, partly to escape the attention of the press. In Faithfull's recollection, while Harrison and Boyd were the "real spiritual seekers" and Lennon also was "in his own way", McCartney was "very cynical" about the venture. All of the Beatles were drawn to the Maharishi's contention that bliss was attainable through short sessions of meditation, with minimal change to their working day and regular lifestyle. Starr later said of his first meeting with the Maharishi: "The man was so full of joy and happiness and it just blew my mind ... I thought 'I want some of that'." (Note: Starr added that it was "one of those mind-altering moments of your life".)

A large crowd of fans was gathered at Bangor railway station awaiting the Beatles' arrival. The retreat was held at Bangor Normal College and served as an initiation course in Transcendental Meditation. The Beatles and around 300 others learned the basics of TM, and each initiate was given a personal mantra. In a 1967 interview, Harrison explained the process:

Each person's life pulsates in a certain rhythm, so they give you a word or sound, known as a mantra, which pulsates with that rhythm. By using the mantra … to transcend to the subtlest level of thought … the mantra becomes more subtle and more subtle, until finally you've lost even the mantra, and then you find yourself at that level of pure consciousness. (Note: According to the Maharishi's teachings, there were seven "levels" of consciousness. In author Gary Tillery's description, these were: waking, dreaming, deep sleep, pure or "transcendental" consciousness, cosmic consciousness, God consciousness, and Supreme Knowledge.)

All initiates were asked to donate a week's wages. Lennon described the financial arrangement as "the fairest thing I've heard of", adding: "We'll make a donation and we'll ask for money from anyone we know with money … anyone in the so-called establishment who's worried about kids going wild and drugs and all that. Another groovy thing: everybody gives one week's wages when they join … And that's all you ever pay, just the once."

On 26 August, the Beatles announced at a press conference that they were giving up hallucinogenic drugs. The announcement came as an about-turn after McCartney had publicly admitted to taking LSD in June 1967, to the dismay of his bandmates. (Note: Despite Lennon and Harrison's urging since 1965, McCartney had declined to join them and Starr in their LSD experimentation until late 1966. His abstinence had created friction in the band, and his mid-1967 announcement was viewed by the other Beatles, particularly Harrison, as an example of McCartney craving attention.) This was in keeping with the Maharishi's teachings, though the group decision had been made before they met him. The Maharishi advised them privately to avoid involvement with the anti-nuclear movement and to support the elected government of the day. Lennon later described the retreat as "incredible" and recalled that Jagger immediately telephoned his Rolling Stones bandmate Keith Richards, telling him to come to Bangor with the other members of the band. (Note: Richards subsequently said that he admired the "basic drive" behind meditation, but that it reached "insane proportions" due to the Beatles' interest. He added that, in contrast to Jagger's curiosity, "I was quite proud I never went and kissed the Maharishi's goddamn feet.")

== Epstein's death ==
The Beatles planned to attend the entire ten-day seminar, but their stay was cut short by the death of their manager Brian Epstein in London on 27 August. Epstein had arranged to entertain friends at his property in Sussex over the bank holiday weekend, but had said that he might join the band towards the end of the seminar. The Maharishi consoled them by saying that Epstein's spirit was still with them, and their good thoughts would help him "to have an easy passage" to his "next evolution". The Beatles held a press conference, during which Lennon and Harrison explained the Maharishi's views on death. According to McCartney, the Maharishi "was great to us when Brian died". Cynthia Lennon later wrote: "it was as though, with Brian gone, the four needed someone new to give them direction and the Maharishi was in the right place at the right time."

== Aftermath and cultural influence ==
The Beatles made plans to spend time at the Maharishi's training centre in Rishikesh, India, in late October. However, at McCartney's urging, they postponed the trip until the new year to work on their Magical Mystery Tour film project, as McCartney felt that they should first focus on their career after the loss of Epstein. Harrison and Lennon appeared on David Frost's television programme in September 1967 espousing the benefits of Transcendental Meditation, at which point, according to Cynthia, Lennon was "evangelical in his enthusiasm for Maharishi". (Note: Lennon said that, thanks to meditation, "I'm a better person and I wasn't bad before", while Harrison stated that "the world is ready for a mystic revolution.") Due to the interest generated by their first appearance on the show, Frost invited the pair back a week later, where they discussed TM with a studio audience of clergymen, academics and journalists.

We want to learn the meditation thing properly, so that we can propagate it and sell the whole idea to everyone. This is how we plan to use our power now. They've always called us leaders of youth, and we believe this is a good way to give a lead.

— John Lennon, September 1967

The Beatles' allegiance to the Maharishi and his teachings marked the first time that the band had committed to employing their influence to popularising a cause. Their attendance at the Bangor seminar, together with Harrison and Lennon's promotional activities, resulted in Transcendental Meditation becoming a worldwide phenomenon. In his book American Veda, author Philip Goldberg likens the Maharishi's Hilton lecture to Swami Vivekananda's visit to the West in 1893 in terms of its importance for Indian religion. As a result of the coverage given to the Beatles' interest in TM, words such as "mantra" and "guru" became commonly used in the West for the first time. While the band's new anti-LSD message was met with public approval, their championing of the Maharishi and TM was often the subject of confusion and ridicule in the mainstream press, particularly in Britain. At a court event in October, Queen Elizabeth II remarked to Sir Joseph Lockwood, the chairman of EMI: "The Beatles are turning awfully funny, aren't they?" Now publicised as "The Beatles' Guru", the Maharishi went on his eighth world tour, giving lectures in Britain, Scandinavia, West Germany, Italy, Canada and the United States.

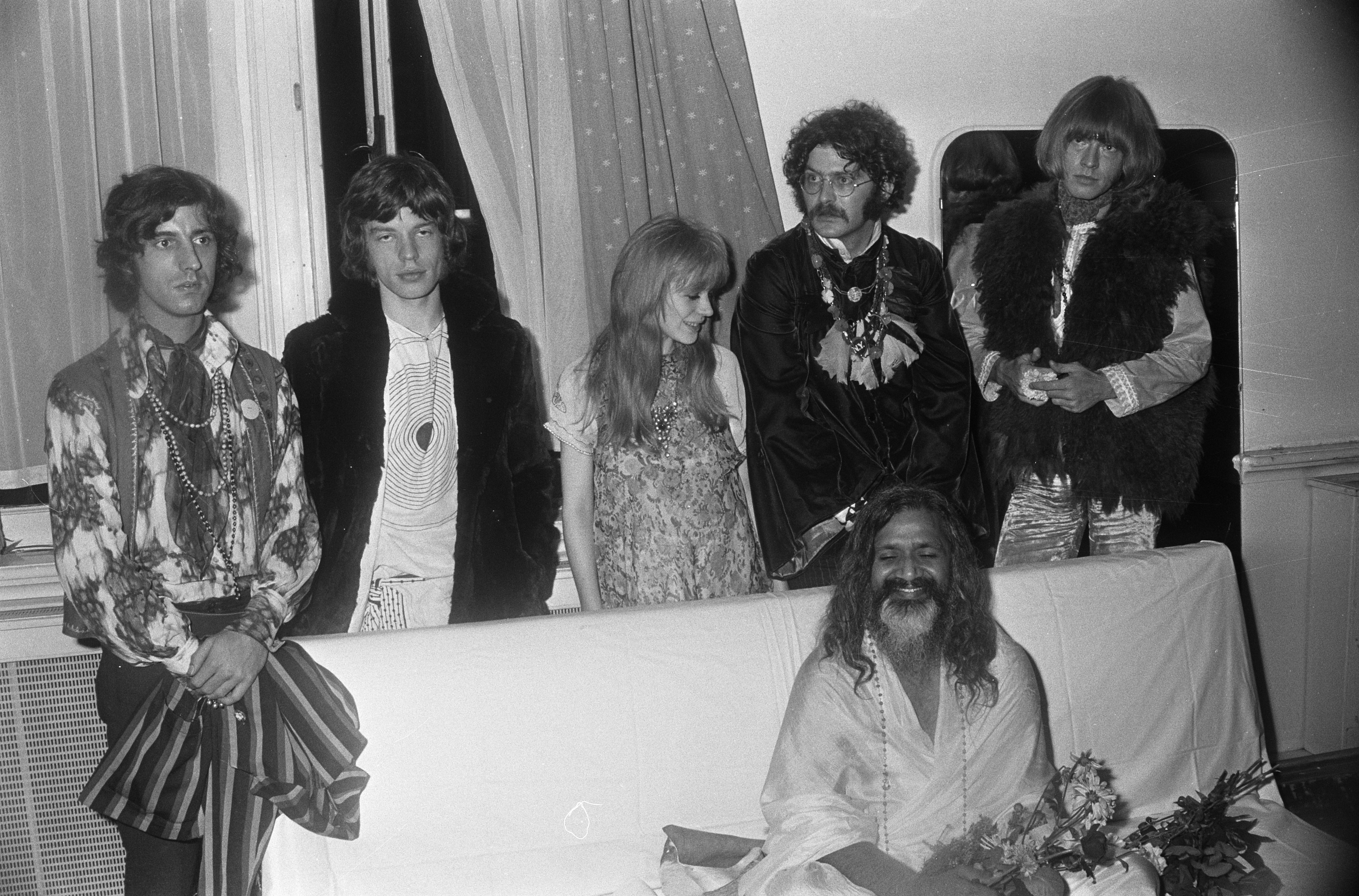
Jagger, Faithfull and Brian Jones (back row: second, third and fifth from left, respectively) meeting with the Maharishi in Amsterdam in September 1967

Among the counterculture and the underground press, the Maharishi's ascendancy was viewed as a significant development in the youth movement's search for universal spiritual awareness. To some members of the US counterculture, the Beatles had found the "answer"; their endorsement of meditation was especially welcome in Haight-Ashbury, where summer's end was marked by an increase in drug casualties. The Beatles' more spiritually aware peers were also inspired by their example. Scottish singer-songwriter Donovan sought out the Maharishi in California, having bonded with Harrison following the latter's return from India in late 1966. Donovan later said that he and Harrison had avidly read Hindu spiritual texts and discussed meditation as a way to achieve genuine higher consciousness, but had lacked the method or a "guide" until meeting the Maharishi. Harrison also introduced Dennis Wilson of the Beach Boys to the Maharishi when he and Lennon joined their teacher at a UNICEF benefit in Paris in December. Other artists who followed the Beatles' lead into TM included members of the Grateful Dead and Jefferson Airplane, all of whom met the Maharishi with Jagger and Donovan in Los Angeles that autumn.

Due to the Beatles' attendance at Bangor and their commitment to study in India, the Maharishi's following increased tenfold to 150,000 students. In November 1967, The Village Voice said that, given how many rock musicians had embraced meditation and the popularity of TM initiation courses on university campuses, "it looks now that Maharishi may become more popular than the Beatles." In February 1968, having twice delayed their departure for India, the Beatles and their romantic partners joined the Maharishi at his ashram in Rishikesh, alongside Donovan, Mike Love of the Beach Boys, and American actress Mia Farrow.

== See also ==
- Outline of the Beatles
- The Beatles timeline

== Sources ==
- The Beatles (2000). The Beatles Anthology. San Francisco: Chronicle Books. ISBN 0-8118-2684-8.
- Bockris, Victor (1992). Keith Richards: The Unauthorised Biography. London: Hutchinson. ISBN 0-09-174397-4.
- Boyd, Pattie; with Junor, Penny (2007). Wonderful Today: The Autobiography. London: Headline Review. ISBN 978-0-7553-1646-5.
- Brown, Peter; Gaines, Steven (2002) [1983]. The Love You Make: An Insider's Story of the Beatles. New York: New American Library. ISBN 978-0-4512-0735-7.
- Clayson, Alan (2003). George Harrison. London: Sanctuary. ISBN 1-86074-489-3.
- Doggett, Peter (2007). There's a Riot Going On: Revolutionaries, Rock Stars, and the Rise and Fall of '60s Counter-Culture. Edinburgh, UK: Canongate Books. ISBN 978-1-84195-940-5.
- The Editors of Rolling Stone (2002). Harrison. New York: Rolling Stone Press. ISBN 978-0-7432-3581-5.
- Everett, Walter (1999). The Beatles as Musicians: Revolver Through the Anthology. New York: Oxford University Press. ISBN 0-19-512941-5.
- Frontani, Michael R. (2007). The Beatles: Image and the Media. Jackson, Mississippi: University Press of Mississippi. ISBN 978-1-57806-966-8.
- Goldberg, Philip (2010). American Veda: From Emerson and the Beatles to Yoga and Meditation – How Indian Spirituality Changed the West. New York: Harmony Books. ISBN 978-0-385-52134-5.
- Goldman, Albert (2001) [1988]. The Lives of John Lennon. Chicago, Illinois: Chicago Review Press. ISBN 978-1-55652-399-1.
- Gould, Jonathan (2007). Can't Buy Me Love: The Beatles, Britain and America. London: Piatkus. ISBN 978-0-7499-2988-6.
- Greene, Joshua M. (2006). Here Comes the Sun: The Spiritual and Musical Journey of George Harrison. Hoboken, New Jersey: John Wiley & Sons. ISBN 978-0-470-12780-3.
- Ingham, Chris (2006). The Rough Guide to the Beatles (2nd edn). London: Rough Guides. ISBN 978-1-84353-720-5.
- Lavezzoli, Peter (2006). The Dawn of Indian Music in the West. New York: Continuum. ISBN 0-8264-2819-3.
- Leitch, Donovan (2007). The Autobiography of Donovan: The Hurdy Gurdy Man. New York: St. Martin's Griffin. ISBN 978-0-312-36434-2.
- Lennon, Cynthia (2005). John. London: Hodder & Stoughton. ISBN 0-340895128.
- MacDonald, Ian (1998). Revolution in the Head: The Beatles' Records and the Sixties. London: Pimlico. ISBN 978-0-7126-6697-8.
- Miles, Barry (1997). Paul McCartney: Many Years from Now. New York: Henry Holt. ISBN 0-8050-5249-6.
- Miles, Barry (2001). The Beatles Diary Volume 1: The Beatles Years. London: Omnibus Press. ISBN 0-7119-8308-9.
- Mojo Special Limited Edition: 1000 Days That Shook the World (The Psychedelic Beatles – April 1, 1965 to December 26, 1967). London: Emap. 2002.
- Norman, Philip (1996) [1981]. Shout!: The Beatles in Their Generation. New York: Fireside. ISBN 0-684-83067-1.
- Rodriguez, Robert (2012). Revolver: How the Beatles Reimagined Rock 'n' Roll. Milwaukee: Backbeat Books. ISBN 978-1-61713-009-0.
- Schaffner, Nicholas (1978). The Beatles Forever. New York: McGraw-Hill. ISBN 0-07-055087-5.
- Shouler, Kenneth; Anthony, Susai (2009). The Everything Hinduism Book: Learn the Traditions and Rituals of the "Religion of Peace". Avon, Massachusetts: Adams Media. ISBN 978-1-59869-862-6.
- Sounes, Howard (2010). Fab: An Intimate Life of Paul McCartney. London: HarperCollins. ISBN 978-0-00-723705-0.
- Tillery, Gary (2010). The Cynical Idealist: A Spiritual Biography of John Lennon. Wheaton, Illinois: Quest Books. ISBN 978-0-8356-0875-6.
- Tillery, Gary (2011). Working Class Mystic: A Spiritual Biography of George Harrison. Wheaton, Illinois: Quest Books. ISBN 978-0-8356-0900-5.
- Turner, Steve (2006). The Gospel According to the Beatles. Louisville, Kentucky: Westminster John Knox Press. ISBN 978-0-664-22983-2.
