= Sylvie Simmons =

Music journalist

- Born: London, England
- Occupations: Music journalist; author; singer; songwriter
- Years active: 1977–present
- Musical career
- Instrument: Ukulele
- Labels: Light in the Attic; Compass Records
- Website: sylviesimmons.com

Sylvie Simmons is a British music journalist, based in California, U.S., named as a "principal player" in Paul Gorman's book on the history of the rock music press In Their Own Write (Sanctuary Publishing, 2001). A widely regarded writer and rock historian since the late 1970s, she is one of the few women to be included among the predominantly male rock elite. Simmons is the author of a number of books, including biography and cult fiction. Simmons is also a singer-songwriter, ukulele player and recording artist.

== Biography ==
=== 1977–1984 ===
In 1977, Simmons decamped to Los Angeles and became US correspondent for Sounds, one of the four major UK rock music weeklies of the period. She wrote interviews, reviews and a weekly column, 'Hollywood Highs'. One of her earliest assignments was being sent on the road with Black Sabbath. During her first years in L.A, among the hundreds of artists she interviewed were AC/DC, Rod Stewart, The Clash, Sex Pistols, Bruce Springsteen, Stevie Nicks, Muddy Waters, Steely Dan, Blondie, Frank Zappa, Tom Petty, Beach Boys, Van Halen, Kiss, and Michael Jackson.

During the '80s, when Los Angeles witnessed an upsurge in heavy metal, hair metal and glam rock, Simmons wrote what are regarded as the definitive features on the movement, being the first journalist to bring then-unknown acts like Mötley Crüe and Guns N' Roses to international attention. (She would go on to co-author the first book on Mötley Crüe with rock writer Malcolm Dome, Lüde, Crüde and Rüde, 1994, out of print).

In 1981 when Sounds editor Geoff Barton founded the UK heavy metal magazine Kerrang!, he asked Simmons to be its L.A correspondent. She did so, under the pseudonym (and blonde wig) of Laura Canyon, while continuing to write under her own name for Sounds.

During her LA period, Simmons wrote a weekly music column for the Knight-Ridder newspaper syndicate; a monthly column for the Japanese magazine Music Life; and interviews/articles for a number of European publications. She was a regular contributor to the US rock magazine Creem and co-hosted the syndicated US rock radio show "London Wavelength".

=== 1984–1993 ===
In 1984 Simmons moved back to North London continuing to write for Sounds and Kerrang! along with other UK magazines and newspapers - Q, The Times, the Radio Times and The Guardian. She wrote for US, European, and Japanese magazines, this time as a UK correspondent, including Creem, Creem Metal, Rockin F; Metal Hammer. Among the artists she interviewed during this period were Joni Mitchell; Cyndi Lauper; Kate Bush; Warren Zevon; Little Richard; Boy George; Mick Jagger; Sting; George Michael; Jimmy Page; Robert Plant; Elton John.

In 1990 Simmons moved to France. She continued to write about music, making frequent trips to London and L.A. to do interviews.

Simmons started writing rock-related short fiction. These would later be published as Too Weird For Ziggy, (Black Cat, ISBN 0-8021-4156-0) a collection of interlinked short stories about the weirdness of celebrity. Grove/Atlantic resurrected its Black Cat imprint (previously home to William S. Burroughs and Henry Miller) to publish Simmons' first collection of fiction. The book bore testimonials from Sharon Osbourne, Marianne Faithfull, Slash of Guns N' Roses, Lemmy of Motörhead and Tori Amos, and was widely praised.

During her years in France, Simmons started investigating French pop music and was particularly taken with Serge Gainsbourg. This too would result in a book - the highly lauded Serge Gainsbourg: A Fistful of Gitanes (Helter Skelter Publishing, 2001 ISBN 1-900924-28-5). J. G. Ballard chose it as his book of the year. It was published in the UK in 2001 and translated from the English original into ten languages. In 2015 an expanded digital edition of Serge Gainsbourg: A Fistful of Gitanes was released, in English, Spanish, Portuguese, and Japanese.

In the summer of 1993, Simmons was contacted by the editors of Q about a new magazine they were designing, with the focus on classic rock artists. MOJO magazine was launched in October 1993. Simmons wrote for the first issue and has written for MOJO, as Contributing Editor, ever since.

=== 1994–2004 ===
Simmons moved back to London and continued to write. Her Interviews during this period included Tom Waits; Neil Young; Johnny Cash; Leonard Cohen; Brian Wilson; Peter Gabriel; David Byrne; PJ Harvey; Keith Richards; Kate Bush; and Bo Diddley.

In 1997 Simmons inaugurated MOJO's influential "Americana" column to give more exposure to the new wave of independent roots music by artists. She has written the Americana column ever since.

Subsequently, she compiled and wrote liner notes for the compilation album The Rough Guide to Americana, on the World Music Network, in 2001 and the follow-up album released in 2016.

Simmons' essay, "States of Mind", on Country music, Americana and America's myth of itself, was published in the book 1000 Songs To Change Your Life (Random House, 2008, ISBN 978-1-84670-082-8), an anthology that also featured essays by Bjork, David Byrne, Ennio Morricone, Linda Thompson and Tom Waits.

During this period she made a number of appearances on radio, TV and DVDs. talking about music, including Beautiful Dreamer: Brian Wilson and the Story of Smile (director David Leaf, 2004).

Simmons contributed essays and writings to a number of books during this period, including The Virgin Story of Rock ’N Roll (1995), Girls Will Be Boys: Women Report on Rock (1997), Kiss: Modern Icons (1997), The MOJO Collection: Ultimate Music Companion (2000), and Let Fury Have the Hour: the Punk Rock Politics of Joe Strummer (2004).

In 2001 Simmons's biography of Neil Young was published: Neil Young- Reflections in Broken Glass (MOJO Books/Canongate, ISBN 1 84195 084X).

Simmons compiled and/or curated a number of liner notes for artists ranging from David Bowie to Leonard Cohen to the Red Hot Chili Peppers. Perhaps the best known is "Unearthed", the widely regarded hardback book she wrote, at the request of Johnny Cash and Rick Rubin, Cash's producer. It was to be released in conjunction with a CD box set to celebrate Cash and Rubin's decade of working together. (American Recordings, 2003). "Unearthed" turned out to be Cash's first posthumous release, and their interviews – conducted over a one-week period at Cash's home less than six weeks before he died – the last major interviews he would give.

=== 2004–present ===
In 2004, Simmons moved to San Francisco, California. She continued to write and publish interviews, articles, reviews, for MOJO, The Guardian, various European publications, and during her early years in Frisco, her local newspaper, the San Francisco Chronicle.

Her interviews during this period included Joan Baez; the Eagles; Marianne Faithfull; Jackson Browne; Kris Kristofferson; Willie Nelson; Crosby Stills & Nash; Neil Diamond; Rosanne Cash; Glen Campbell.

Her liner notes now included Americana and country artists, including Linda Ronstadt, Kris Kristofferson, Emmylou Harris, Waylon Jennings and Willie Nelson.

Her liner notes for the CD/DVD Leonard Cohen: Live at the Isle of Wight (Sony) won her an ASCAP Deems-Taylor Award.

She appeared on a number of radio shows and music-related TV shows including The Seven Ages of Rock (BBC Two, 2007; VH1 2008).

In 2010, Simmons was featured in the movie The Mighty Uke: The Amazing Comeback of a Musical Underdog, talking about the upsurge of interest in the ukulele. Simmons had played piano, recorder, clarinet, and guitar at various times in her life, but when she moved to San Francisco she left her instruments in storage in England. So she acquired a ukulele. It was given its first public airing at the end of a documentary that the BBC made on Simmons in 2011, called The Rock Chick

==== Leonard Cohen ====
From 2009 to 2012, Simmons was writing a major biography of Leonard Cohen. With Cohen's blessing, Simmons interviewed more than a hundred people for the book, including Cohen himself. I'm Your Man: The Life of Leonard Cohen was published in September 2012 by Ecco/HarperCollins in the US, McClelland & Stewart in Canada and Jonathan Cape/Random House in the UK.

A New York Times best-seller, the book received extremely favourable reviews. The New York Times' reviewer Janet Maslin described it as "The definitive Cohen portrait, fearless and smart. The major, soul-searching biography that Cohen deserves." The LA Times called it "A new gold standard of biographies." NPR critic Michael Scaub named it the best biography of the year.

I'm Your Man: The Life of Leonard Cohen was also an international best-seller, and No 1 on the Canadian national book charts.

In September 2012, Simmons began an unconventional book tour. Traveling across America and then the world with her book and a ukulele, she talked about Leonard Cohen, read from the book and performed his songs – often accompanied by different guest musicians in each town. Her performances were not only in bookstores, libraries and literary festivals, but in rock music nightclubs, record stores, churches, synagogues, and at museums and music festivals.

The tour continued for more than a year, with shows performed in the US, UK, Germany, Canada, New Zealand and Australia. Although the tour officially ended with the release of the paperback edition of the book in September 2013, she continues to play Leonard Cohen shows at special events. She has made numerous appearances as a keynote speaker at universities, museums and other institutions, talking about Cohen and writing his biography.

The book itself has been published in more than 20 languages: Brazilian Portuguese, Chinese, Croatian, Czech, Danish, Dutch, Finnish, French, French-Canadian, German, Hebrew, Hungarian, Italian, Korean, Norwegian, Polish, Portuguese, Serbian, Slovenian, Spanish, Turkish, Taiwanese, with more translations underway.

In March 2014 the audiobook edition won an Audiofile Earphones Award. In 2017 a French-language version of the audiobook was released.

In 2017, a year after Cohen died, Simmons wrote another chapter for her book, picking up where the original book stopped - a conversation with Leonard on the balcony of his L.A. home – and telling the story of his life and work from 2012 up to his end. The new updated edition was published in the UK and Canada and Spain and in the more recent translated editions.

In 2017, Simmons was invited to the Museum of Contemporary Art in Montreal be keynote speaker and a panelist at a major exhibition dedicated to Leonard Cohen Une Breche en Toute Chose/A Crack in Everything. She was interviewed onstage by Eleanor Wachtel for the prestigious CBC cultural radio program Writers & Company. Simmons wrote an essay on Cohen for the exhibition's catalog, the hardback book Leonard Cohen: A Crack In Everything ISBN 978-2-551-26176-5

In 2018 the Leonard Cohen exhibition went on tour, making its first stop at the Jewish Museum of New York, and Simmons did an event there. Later the same year, when the exhibition moved to Copenhagen, Denmark, Simmons was the keynote speaker and hosted a masterclass in writing biography.

==== Music ====
When she was in her fifties, Simmons came out as a singer-songwriter. In interviews she said that performing Leonard Cohen songs on her book tour cured her of the stage fright that put a stop to her being a singer in her youth, and had led to her decision to write about music instead. She started featuring her own songs in concerts, continuing to accompany herself on a ukulele.

She recorded her debut album, Sylvie, at Wavelab Studio in Tucson, AZ, produced by Howe Gelb of Giant Sand. Gelb had been an early supporter of her songs and encouraged her to make a record. The record label Light In The Attic Records asked to release it, making Simmons the first artist to release their debut on the label.

The album Sylvie was released in November 2014 and earned universally good reviews. The Guardian called it "one of the most beautiful low-key albums of the year" and the Times called it "Poetic, Guileless, reminiscent of a female Leonard Cohen."

In 2015, following a concert in Santiago, Chile, Simmons and two Chilean musicians Matias Cena and Diego Alorda recorded Algo En Algo, a pop-up record of six songs they played at the show and released it for free.

In 2018 Simmons' songs, "Hard Act To Follow", appeared in the Hollywood movie based on the Nick Hornby book "Juliet, Naked."

Simmons' second album Blue on Blue was released August 14, 2020, on Compass Records. Howe Gelb once again handled production duties and various members of Giant Sand contribute. This too was greeted with a good review.

==== Books and journalism ====
In 2015, Simmons began a collaboration with Debbie Harry, co-writing Harry's memoir Face It. The book was published in 2019 and was a New York Times bestseller.

Simmons was a featured essayist in the anthology Faith: Essays from Believers, Agnostics, and Essayists (Simon and Schuster, 2015).

Her articles on rock and interviews were featured in anthologies on Joni Mitchell; Lou Reed; Leonard Cohen; Steely Dan; Fleetwood Mac; and Tom Waits.

== Bibliography ==
Books by Sylvie Simmons

2012 I'm Your Man: The Life of Leonard Cohen. (Ecco, US; Jonathan Cape, UK; McClelland & Stewart, Canada) 2018 Updated edition (Vinage, UK; McClelland, Canada) Translations: Brazilian Portuguese, Chinese, Croatian, Czech, Danish, Dutch, Finnish, French, French-Canadian, German, Hebrew, Hungarian, Italian, Korean, Norwegian, Polish, Portuguese, Serbian, Slovenian, Spanish, Turkish, Taiwanese.

2004 Too Weird for Ziggy. (Black Cat/Grove, US; Grove Atlantic, UK). Translations: Russian.

2003 Johnny Cash: Unearthed (American Recordings)

2001 Serge Gainsbourg: A Fistful of Gitanes.. (Helter Skelter UK; 2002 Da Capo, US. Updated digital edition 2015) Translations: English, Spanish, Portuguese, Japanese, Dutch, Italian, French, German, Dutch.

2001 Neil Young: Reflections in Broken Glass. Biography (UK and US (MOJO/Canongate)

Books co-written by Sylvie Simmons

2019 Face It by Debbie Harry and Sylvie Simmons (Dey St, US)

1994 Lüde Crüde and Rüde:- The Story of Mötley Crüe - by Sylvie Simmons and Malcolm Dome (Castle Communications) ISBN 9781898141952

Anthologies: featuring essays or articles by Sylvie Simmons

Joni on Joni: Interviews with Joni Mitchell (2019) - essay/interview

My Week Beats Your Year: Encounters with Lou Reed (2019)

Leonard Cohen: A Crack in Everything (2018)

Major Dudes: A Steely Dan Companion (2018)

Visions from the Tower of Song: Essays (2017)

Fleetwood Mac on Fleetwood Mac (2016)

Faith: Essays from Believers, Agnostics and Atheists (2015)

Tom Waits on Tom Waits: Interviews and Encounters (2011)

1000 Songs to Change Your Life (2008)

Creem: America's Only Rock 'N Roll Magazine (2007)

London Noir (2006)

Let Fury Have the Hour: the Punk Rock Politics of Joe Strummer (2004)

The MOJO Collection: Ultimate Music Companion (2000)

Kiss: Modern Icons (1997)

Girls Will Be Boys: Women Report on Rock (1997)

The Virgin Story of Rock n Roll (1995)
