= Brian Wilson is a genius =

Promotional campaign for the Beach Boys' leader

A magazine article proclaiming Brian Wilson of the Beach Boys to be a genius (Melody Maker, May 21, 1966)

"Brian Wilson is a genius" is a line that became part of a media campaign spearheaded in 1966 by the Beatles' former press officer Derek Taylor, who was then employed as the Beach Boys' publicist. Although there are earlier documented expressions of the statement, Taylor frequently called Brian Wilson a "genius" – a belief Taylor sincerely held – as part of an effort to rebrand the Beach Boys and further legitimize Wilson as a serious artist on a par with the Beatles and Bob Dylan.

With the aid of numerous associates in the music industry, Taylor's promotional efforts were integral to the success of the band's 1966 album Pet Sounds in England. By the end of the year, an NME reader's poll placed Wilson as the fourth-ranked "World Music Personality"—about 1,000 votes ahead of Bob Dylan and 500 behind John Lennon. However, the hype generated for the group's intended follow-up album, Smile, bore a number of unintended consequences for the Beach Boys' reputation and internal dynamic. Wilson ultimately scrapped Smile and reduced his involvement with the group.

Wilson later said that the "genius" branding intensified the pressures of his career and led him to become "a victim of the recording industry". As he shied away from the industry in the years afterward, his ensuing legend originated the trope of the "reclusive genius" among studio-oriented musical artists and later inspired comparisons to other musicians such as Pink Floyd's Syd Barrett and My Bloody Valentine's Kevin Shields.

== Background and origins ==
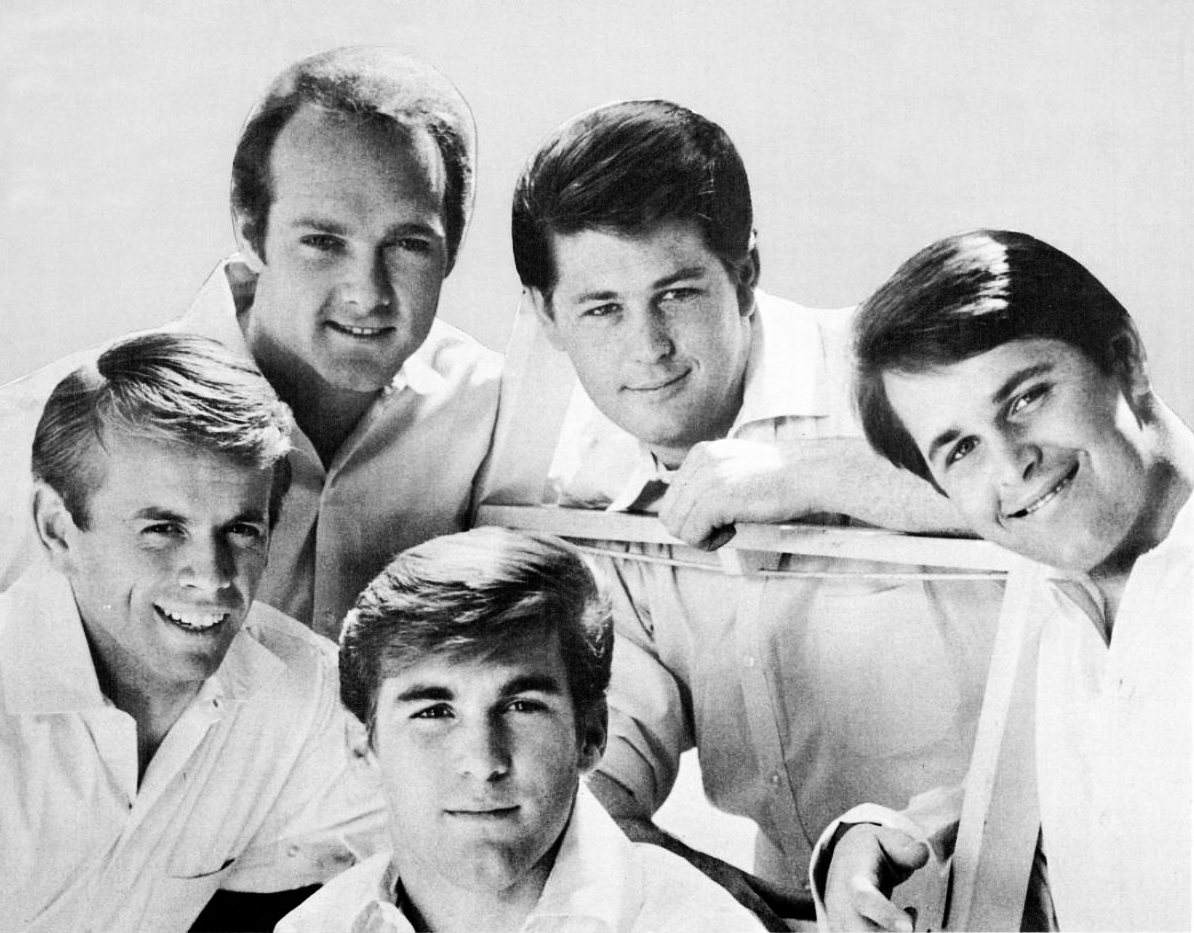
The Beach Boys at a 1964 photoshoot. Wilson (top-center) felt that his band's clean-cut image distracted from the sophistication of his music.

Brian Wilson wrote the majority of the Beach Boys' hits and was one of the first recording artists allowed to act as an entrepreneurial producer, a position he attained thanks to his immediate success with the band after their signing to Capitol Records in 1962. Wilson's talents inspired a number of Los Angeles music industry figures to refer to him as a genius. (Note: In September 1965, a press report stated that Brian was absent from the Beach Boys' concerts because he was "busy being a genius and composing more songs". There also exists an early 1965 recording of Murry Wilson telling Brian "I'm a genius, too" during an argument about the song "Help Me Rhonda".) By early 1966, he wanted to move the group beyond their surf and hot rod aesthetic, an image that he believed was outdated and distracting the public from his talents as a producer and songwriter. In Mike Love's description, Wilson sought recognition from the countercultural tastemakers, or the "hip intelligentsia". (Note: Van Dyke Parks remembered: "Brian sought me out ... At that time, people who experimented with psychedelics—no matter who they were—were viewed as 'enlightened people', and Brian sought out the enlightened people.") Wilson later reflected that "legends grew about ... our music ... and I was getting fascinated with the fact that I was becoming famous and there was an interest in my style of life."

In the meantime, the Beatles' former press agent Derek Taylor had left the UK and moved to California, where he started his own public relations company. By 1966, he had quickly assimilated into what was then an expanding coterie of Wilson's worldly-minded friends, musicians, mystics, and business advisers. In the description of music journalist Nick Kent, "Derek Taylor was at that time the single most prestigious figure with whom to have one's name linked in matters of promotion. ... he knew the Beatles and had actually worked with them and Brian Epstein. There could be no more spectacular recommendation."

Van Dyke Parks, Wilson's lyricist at the time, claimed to have introduced Taylor to Wilson, while biographer David Leaf wrote that it was Bruce Johnston who "set up a meeting for Derek with Brian." The Beach Boys began employing Taylor as their publicist in March 1966, two months before the release of their album Pet Sounds, with the group paying him a salary of $750 a month (equivalent to $7,440 in 2025). According to Carl Wilson, although the band were aware that trends and the music industry were shifting, "Capitol had a very set picture of us", and the band were unhappy with the way the label promoted them circa Pet Sounds.

According to Taylor, the "genius" promotion came from Brian discussing how "he thought he was better than most other people believed him to be". Taylor recalled one conversation with Brian and Dennis Wilson in which the brothers denied ever writing "surf music or songs about cars or that the Beach Boys had been involved in any way with the surf and drag fads ... they would not concede." (Note: Like the Beatles, he felt, it was "sad that they should be so determined to disown their past.") In Taylor's view, the Beach Boys' clean-cut "all-American" image, instigated by former manager and the Wilsons' father Murry, had "done them a hell of a lot of damage. Brian, in particular, suffered." He said that the prevailing attitude was that "Brian Wilson was not supposed to be strange", even though that quality was seen as normal for Hollywood people. (Note: However, he still struggled with Wilson's eccentricities, especially his "temporary whims" and his "mad competitiveness" with the Beatles.)

Absolutely, Brian Wilson is certainly a genius. It was something I felt had to be established. ... despite his strangeness, how could you deny him when he was creating [songs like] "Surf's Up"?

— Derek Taylor on Brian Wilson, 1974

After becoming aware of how highly regarded Wilson was to musician friends such as Parks and singer Danny Hutton, Taylor wondered why it was not the mainstream consensus, and began "putting it around, making almost a campaign out of it". To update the band's image with firsthand accounts of Wilson's latest activities, Taylor's prestige was crucial in offering a credible perspective to those outside Wilson's inner circle. He became intent on promoting Wilson as an exceptional "genius" among pop artists, a belief that he genuinely held.

== Contemporary press ==
=== Pet Sounds and "Good Vibrations" ===
One of the earliest instances of Taylor announcing that Wilson was a genius was in his 1966 article titled "Brian Wilson: Whizzkid Behind the Beach Boys". More references to the "genius" rhetoric appeared in Melody Maker and New Musical Express, specifically the articles "Brian, Pop Genius!" by Don Traynor (May 21, 1966), "Brian Wilson's Puppets?" by Alan Walsh (November 12, 1966), and "Brian: Loved or Loathed Genius" by Tracy Thomas (January 28, 1967). In Taylor's writings, Wilson was presented as a pop luminary on the level of esteemed contemporaries such as John Lennon, Paul McCartney, and Bob Dylan, as well as classical figures such as Bach, Beethoven, and Mozart. What follows is a typical excerpt by Taylor, identified as "'60s Hollywood reporter Jerry Fineman", and contains some exaggerated claims:

This is Brian Wilson. He is a Beach Boy. Some say he is more. Some say he is a Beach Boy and a genius. This twenty-three-year-old powerhouse not only sings with the famous group, he writes the words and music then arranges, engineers, and produces the disc ... Even the packaging and design on the record jacket is controlled by the talented Mr. Wilson. He has often been called "genius", and it's a burden.

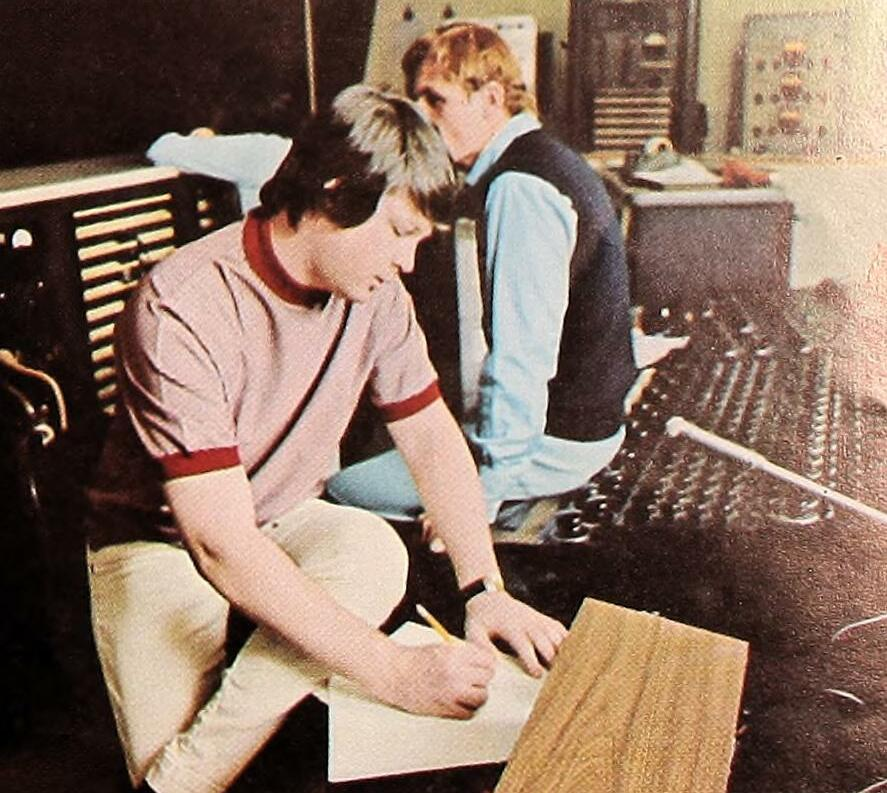
Wilson producing a Pet Sounds recording session in early 1966

Pet Sounds had been widely influential and raised the band's prestige as an innovative rock group. Taylor is widely recognized as instrumental in the album's success in the UK due to his longstanding connections with the Beatles and other industry figures. This was at a contrast to its underwhelming sales in the U.S., where its promotion was no different from earlier Beach Boys offerings and relied on the group's familiar public image instead of rebranding. (Note: According to Carl, Capitol Records "felt they didn't have to promote it; that our records would automatically sell because we were getting so much airplay.") Although most of the influential writers who had acknowledged the cultural value of Bob Dylan's work were not prepared to devote similar attention the Beach Boys, as biographer Peter Ames Carlin writes, "many musicians [in America] understood the significance of Brian's achievement on the album, as did a few members of the small but increasingly influential band of journalists and intellectuals who had begun to apply serious analytical thought to rock music."

In May, Taylor and Bruce Johnston traveled to London and arranged listening parties for the album, inviting prestigious musicians (including Lennon and McCartney) and rock journalists. These journalists subsequently helped promulgate the idea of Wilson as a "pop genius" and of the album's forward-thinking aesthetic. Much of the British and American press also focused on the disparity between Wilson as a "studio mastermind" and the Beach Boys' stage performances. (Note: Mick Jagger told Melody Maker "I hate The Beach Boys ... but I like Brian Wilson. He's very nice and sort of different to them. ... If you saw The Beach Boys perform live you wouldn't believe it. The drummer can't seem to keep time to save his life.") Rolling Stone founding editor Jann Wenner later reported that British fans identified the Beach Boys as "years ahead" of the Beatles and declared Wilson a "genius". Musicians who praised Wilson on record included Lennon, Eric Clapton of Cream, Rolling Stones producer Andrew Loog Oldham, Spencer Davis of the Spencer Davis Group, and Mick Jagger of the Rolling Stones. Clapton told Melody Maker that "Brian Wilson is without doubt a pop genius."

Throughout the summer of 1966, Wilson concentrated on finishing the group's next single, "Good Vibrations". Additional writers were brought in as witnesses to his Columbia, Gold Star, and Western recording sessions, who also accompanied him outside the studio. Among the crowd: Richard Goldstein from the Village Voice, Jules Siegel from The Saturday Evening Post, and Paul Williams, the 18-year-old founder and editor of Crawdaddy! Released on October 10, 1966, "Good Vibrations" was the Beach Boys' third U.S. number-one hit, reaching the top of the charts in December, and became their first number one in Britain. One headline proclaimed that the Beach Boys' British distributor EMI Records were giving the band the "biggest campaign since the Beatles".

A Los Angeles Times West Magazine piece by Tom Nolan focused on the contradictions between Wilson's unassuming "suburban" demeanor and the reputation that preceded him (noting "he doesn't look at all like the seeming leader of a potentially-revolutionary movement in pop music"). Asked about the future of pop music, Wilson responded, "White spirituals, I think that's what we're going to hear. Songs of faith." (Note: Nolan's same November 1966 article reports that Wilson's change in direction was inspired by a psychedelic experience he had one year prior: "He'd never take it again, he says, because that would be pointless, wouldn't it? And the people who take it all the time, acid heads he can't go along with. Like all those people–Timothy Leary and all–they talk a lot, but they don't really create, you know?") At the end of 1966, NME conducted a reader's poll that placed Wilson as the fourth-ranked "World Music Personality"—about 1,000 votes ahead of Bob Dylan and 500 behind John Lennon. The Beach Boys themselves were crowned the top vocal group, ahead of the Beatles. Ringo Starr remarked, "We're all four fans of the Beach Boys. Maybe we voted for them."

=== Smile and cancellation ===
Wilson declared in a late 1966 interview that the Beach Boys' next album, Smile, would surpass all of their previous recording efforts. In April 1967, CBS aired the Leonard Bernstein-hosted television special Inside Pop: The Rock Revolution, where Wilson premiered the unreleased song "Surf's Up". The next month, Taylor announced that Smile had been "scrapped", and the music press subsequently amplified their romanticized depictions of Wilson.

In October, Cheetah magazine published "Goodbye Surfing, Hello God!", a memoir written by Jules Siegel. It included a tongue-in-cheek reference to the widespread "genius" rhetoric, with Siegel pondering the question of whether Wilson was "a genius, Genius, or GENIUS". Siegel covered Wilson's struggle to overcome the band's surfing image in the U.S. and credited the collapse of Smile to "an obsessive cycle of creation and destruction that threatened not only his career and his fortune but also his marriage, his friendships, his relationships with the Beach Boys and, some of his closest friends worried, his mind".

According to academic Kirk Curnett, Siegel's article was "the most instrumental in establishing Brian as mercurial in the broader senses of that term: as an eccentric and erratic artist perilously pursuing the muse instead of blithely serving the masses". Also discussing the article, professor Andrew Flory wrote:

Siegel greatly romanticized Wilson and Smile, echoing and fostering the pervasive audience view of Wilson as a tortured genius ... Depicting Wilson in decline, with the non-release of Smile as the most obvious byproduct of mental and creative psychosis ... gave rock fans a manner in which to view Wilson as hip, helping countercultural audiences traverse the social chasm between "Fun, Fun, Fun" and "Good Vibrations." ... [The article also] venerated Smile as a relic of this hipness, intensifying audience interest in the unavailable work

== Impact on Wilson's withdrawal ==
When "God Only Knows" came out, Paul [McCartney] called it the greatest song ever written. If that's so, what was there left for me to do?

— Brian Wilson, 1976

Wilson later said that he had run out of ideas by 1967 "in a conventional sense" and was "about ready to die". He also expressed a dissatisfaction with being branded a genius: "Once you've been labeled as a genius, you have to continue it or your name becomes mud. I am a victim of the recording industry." Parks echoed that Taylor's line "forced Brian Wilson to have to continuously prove that he's a genius". Mike Love said that Wilson turned to drugs as a way to expand his creative conceptions and deliver on the comparisons he had received with the Beatles and Mozart.

On December 14, 1967, Jann Wenner printed an influential article in Rolling Stone that denounced the "genius" label, which he called a "promotional shuck" and a "pointless" attempt to compare Wilson with the Beatles. He wrote: "Wilson believed [that he was a genius] and felt obligated to make good of it. It left Wilson in a bind ... which meant that a year elapsed between Pet Sounds and their latest release, Smiley Smile." As a result of the article, many rock fans excluded the group from "serious consideration". In a September 1968 piece for Jazz & Pop, Gene Sculatti wrote that a rock controversy involving Wilson was brewing among "the academic 'rock as art' critic-intellectuals, the AM-tuned teenies, and all the rest of us in between. ... the California sextet is simultaneously hailed as genius incarnate and derided as the archetypical pop music copouts".

Wilson's bandmates resented that he had been singled out as a "genius". Love reflected that while Brian deserved the recognition, the press was a frustration to everyone in the group, including Carl, who was especially bothered by the misconception that the members were "nameless music components in Brian's music machine". (Note: In a 1966 article that asked if "the Beach Boys rely too much on sound genius Brian", his brother Carl rejected the notion, explaining that although Brian was the most responsible for their music, every member of the group contributed ideas. Conversely, Dennis defended Brian's stature in the band, stating "Brian Wilson is the Beach Boys. He is the band. We're his fucking messengers. He is all of it. Period. We're nothing. He's everything.") Brian's then-wife Marilyn intimated that Brian "felt guilty that he got all the attention and ... was called a genius" and decided to reduce his involvement with the band "because he thought that they all hated him". (Note: Producer and friend Terry Melcher attributed Wilson's diminished output to being aware of "his reputation, so he makes a lot of unfinished records; sometimes, I feel that he feels that he's peaked and does not want to put his stamp on records so that peers will have a Brian Wilson track to criticize." Alternatively, the band's former engineer Stephen Desper said that Brian's reduced contributions was "just that you've got limited hours in the day. Brian ... doesn't like to hurt anyone's feelings, so if someone's working on something else, he wasn't going to jump in there and say, 'Look, this is my production and my house, so get outta here!' That's totally out of character for him.") From 1968 onward, his songwriting output declined substantially, but the public narrative of "Brian-as-leader" continued. He became increasingly known for his reclusiveness and would not attract the level of press attention he had achieved in the 1960s until a new marketing campaign, "Brian's Back!", was devised in 1976.

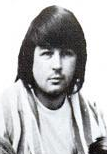
Wilson in 1971

By the 1970s, there had formed a contingent of fans and detractors who viewed Wilson as a burned-out casualty of the psychedelic era. Some of the characterizations advanced by industry insiders included "genius musician but an amateur human being", "washed-up", "bloated", "another sad fucking case", and "a loser". (Note: Writing in his 1970 book Awopbopaloobop Alopbamboom: The Golden Age of Rock, Nik Cohn depicted Wilson as "increasingly withdrawn, brooding, hermitic ... and occasionally, he is to be seen in the back of some limousine, cruising around Hollywood, bleary and unshaven, huddled way tight into himself.") In a 1971 interview, Carl commented that the Jules Siegel writings "and a lot of that stuff that went around before really turned [Brian] off." He explained that most of it was "grossly inaccurate" and characterized Brian as "a very highly evolved person" who is "very sensitive at the same time, which can be confusing," adding that Brian does not cooperate with the press "at all".

In 1975, NME published an extended three-part piece by journalist Nick Kent, "The Last Beach Movie", which depicted Wilson as an overeating, fey eccentric. According to music historian Luis Sanchez: "The article followed the bombast of Siegel's 'Genius with a capital G' line to some bizarre ends. ... the reader is left with the image of an insufferable man out of touch with reality: the leader of The Beach Boys reduced to a caricature, tormented by his own genius." (Note: Kent wrote a follow-up to the piece in 1980, where he reported that the Beach Boys "hated" the original article so much that they "instigated a long drawn-out communication breakdown with the paper lasting a number of years". Bruce Johnston stated in another music magazine that Wilson became "suicidally depressed" after reading the original article.) Carlin wrote that Wilson's "public suffering" effectively "transformed him from a musical figure into a cultural one", while journalist Paul Lester said that Wilson, by the mid-1970s, had tied with ex-Pink Floyd member Syd Barrett as "rock's numero uno mythical casualty."

In 1978, David Leaf's biography The Beach Boys and the California Myth was published. While the "Goodbye Surfing, Hello God" article originated all the main reference points of the Wilson/Smile mythology, Sanchez references Leaf's book as the first work that "put the 'Brian Wilson is a genius' trope into perspective", especially by emphasizing a "dynamic of good guys and bad guys." (Note: For Taylor's part, he could not recall hearing "a single disparaging word" about Brian from the other Beach Boys during his employment with the group; "Maybe a few jokes about his eccentricities, but always basically affectionate.") Quoted in the book, music journalist Ben Edmonds cited Taylor's "'Brian Wilson Is a Genius' hype" as "one of those things that has come back to haunt Brian like a curse. ... the whole playing on the Brian Wilson mythology, whether it be for that point in time or 1976, has always been crucial to manipulating the Beach Boys."

== Retrospective criticism ==
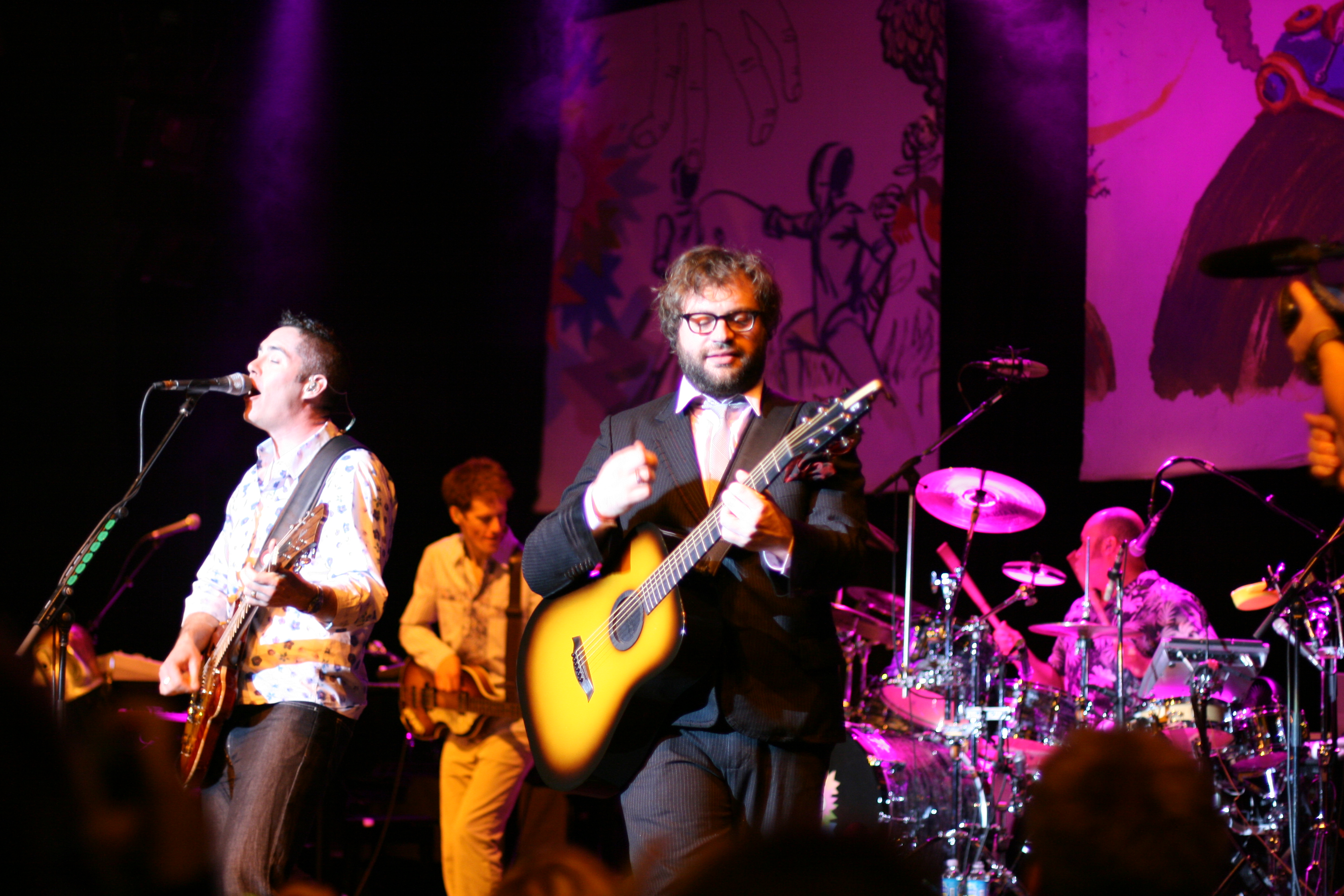
Steven Page (front) was so inspired by stories of Wilson's "mad genius" that he wrote a song, "Brian Wilson", that became a hit for his band Barenaked Ladies in 1992.

A major tenet of Wilson's "genius" image rests on a narrative that is familiar to the arc of a tragic artist. At the center of this mythos, according to music critic Carl Wilson, (Note: No relation to the Beach Boys' Carl Wilson.) is this "tragic genius", equivalent in popular music to "the tragic genius of Vincent van Gogh" in modern art, and one that has reverberated across "new records and retrospective box sets, countless books and essays, documentaries, TV movies, fictional accounts, ... and tribute songs".

Contributing for The Independent, Barney Hoskyns described Taylor's campaign in 1995 as "the birth of a pop cult" and added that the term genius "is actually a rare commodity in pop music" more likely to be reserved for artists who espouse "tragedy", "failed promise", "torment", "or the very least by major eccentricity." He located the "particular appeal" of Wilson's genius to "the fact that the Beach Boys were the very obverse of hip – the unlikeliness of these songs growing out of disposable surf pop – and in the singular naivety and ingenuousness of his personality." (Note: In Gene Sculatti's 1968 editorial, titled "In Defense of the Beach Boys", he praised the "characteristic innocence and somewhat childlike visions" that were imbued in their music. Wenner's 1967 article also criticized the Beach Boys' "totally disappointing" live performances: "To please their fans, they do their old material but make fun of it. Their old material is fine and they should do it with pride that they have every reason to take.") Writing for the BBC in 2015, Carl concluded that much of the interest in Wilson's life had derived primarily from a "human-interest angle" concerned with "the popular tendency to fetishise any overlap between genius and madness" rather than a purely musical one, ultimately distorting "both Wilson's story and his significance." (Note: Carl argued that Wilson's combination of "clean-cut, boy-next-door appeal with aesthetic forward-thinking was what made [him] a real anomaly in US pop-culture history. And in that myth was also the seed of his downfall, as creativity and conformity collided.")

Writing in The Rolling Stone Record Guide (1983), Dave Marsh bemoaned that Wilson had become a "Major Artist" through the hype that had continued to surround Wilson and the Smile project throughout the 1970s, calling it "an exercise in myth-mongering almost unparalleled in show business". Van Dyke Parks believed that Wilson was a highly innovative songwriter, but that it was a "mistake" to call him a genius, instead preferring the description of "a lucky guy with a tremendous amount of talent and a lot of people collaborating beautifully around him." (Note: In Parks' opinion, "genius" was more befitting for the singer-songwriter Harry Nilsson.)

As a result of the mythology surrounding Wilson, Mike Love is often regarded as Wilson's lifelong antagonist. After a jury ruled that Love was owed credit to 39 songs previously credited solely to Wilson and that Wilson or his agents had engaged in promissory fraud, the potential damages were estimated to range between $58 million and $342 million. According to Love, fans of Wilson thought "he was beyond accountability. ... By now, the myth was too strong, the legend too great. Brian was the tormented genius who suffered to deliver us his music—the forever victim, as his lawyer said."

Record producer Don Was created a documentary about Wilson, I Just Wasn't Made for These Times (1995), reportedly to address why the phrase "Brian Wilson is a genius" had become "holy gospel" among musicians. C.W. Mahoney of The Washington Free Beacon characterized Wilson's appeal to Millennials as "a Daniel Johnston who made listenable music". (Note: Johnston is a singer-songwriter who has a mental illness and who has a sizable cult following. Press coverage rarely speaks critically of the musician. The Guardian's David McNamee argued that "superlative praise is just one of the many ways the great outsider artist ... has been done a disservice", referencing the 2006 documentary, The Devil and Daniel Johnston, which "explicitly emphasised that Johnston was lo-fi's very own Brian Wilson. This kind of canonising helps no one, least of all Johnston himself.") He opined that Wilson's reputed genius "is evidence of our obsession with childlike innocence and the victory of boring poptimism", adding that Pet Sounds may be "great" but not as sophisticated as other 1966 works by Frank Zappa or Miles Davis.

== Wilson's response ==
Maybe I have a genius for arrangements and harmonics, but I don't think I'm a genius. I'm just a hard-working guy. I believe the word genius applies only to people who can do things that other people can't do. I can't do things others can't. I wasn't a genius in high school and I'm not now. But because of Pet Sounds, people thought I was a genius.

— Brian Wilson, 1976

Wilson said: "I didn't think I was a genius. I thought I had talent. But I didn't think I was a genius." In the early 1990s, he referred to the branding as a burden and as the worst thing that had happened to him: "The idea being that you're automatically categorized, and the idea is to break free ... and do a few things not based on what you think others would want to hear." Asked if he disliked being known as a "crazy guy" who writes "crazy songs", he replied: "Yeah, I do. ... I think it's exaggerated. It's going an extra 20 yards."

In a eulogy given at Taylor's funeral in 1997, Wilson praised Taylor's efforts and credited him with the success of Pet Sounds and "Good Vibrations" in Britain. He stated: "Despite what he wrote about me, it was Derek Taylor who was the genius. He was a genius writer." (Note: In 1978, David Anderle said that Taylor "did a huge amount of work for the Beach Boys. More than I think they to this day know.")

== See also ==
- Astroturfing
- The Beach Boys Love You – album received with a sharp divide between fans and critics, some of whom saw the album as a work of "eccentric genius" whereas others "dismissed it as childish and trivial".
- "Clapton is God"
- Creativity and mental illness
- Honorific nicknames in popular music
- "More popular than Jesus" ("bigger than Jesus")

== Bibliography ==
- Badman, Keith (2004). The Beach Boys: The Definitive Diary of America's Greatest Band, on Stage and in the Studio. Backbeat Books. ISBN 978-0-87930-818-6.
- Bogdanov, Vladimir; Woodstra, Chris; Erlewine, Stephen Thomas, eds. (2002). All Music Guide to Rock: The Definitive Guide to Rock, Pop, and Soul. Backbeat Books. ISBN 978-0-87930-653-3.
- Butler, Jan (2012). "The Beach Boys' Pet Sounds and the Musicology of Record Production". In Frith, Simon; Zagorski-Thomas, Simon (eds.). The Art of Record Production: An Introductory Reader for a New Academic Field. Ashgate Publishing, Ltd. ISBN 978-1-4094-0678-5.
- Carlin, Peter Ames (2006). Catch a Wave: The Rise, Fall, and Redemption of the Beach Boys' Brian Wilson. Rodale. ISBN 978-1-59486-320-2.
- Cohn, Nik (1970). Awopbopaloobop Alopbamboom: The Golden Age of Rock. Grove Press. ISBN 978-0-8021-3830-9.
- Gaines, Steven (1986). Heroes and Villains: The True Story of The Beach Boys. New York: Da Capo Press. ISBN 0306806479.
- Granata, Charles L.; Asher, Tony (2016). Wouldn't It Be Nice: Brian Wilson and the Making of the Beach Boys' Pet Sounds. Chicago Review Press. ISBN 978-1-61373-840-5.
- Highwater, Jamake (1968). Rock and Other Four Letter Words: Music of the Electric Generation. New York: Bantam Books. ISBN 0-552-04334-6.
- Kent, Nick (2009). "The Last Beach Movie Revisited: The Life of Brian Wilson". The Dark Stuff: Selected Writings on Rock Music. Da Capo Press. ISBN 9780786730742.
- Lambert, Philip, ed. (2016). Good Vibrations: Brian Wilson and the Beach Boys in Critical Perspective. University of Michigan Press. ISBN 978-0-472-11995-0.
- Leaf, David (1978). The Beach Boys and the California Myth. New York: Grosset & Dunlap. ISBN 978-0-448-14626-3.
- Love, Mike (2016). Good Vibrations: My Life as a Beach Boy. Penguin Publishing Group. ISBN 978-0-698-40886-9.
- Matijas-Mecca, Christian (2017). The Words and Music of Brian Wilson. ABC-CLIO. ISBN 978-1-4408-3899-6.
- Marsh, Dave; Swenson, John, eds. (1983). The New Rolling Stone Record Guide. New York, NY: Random House/Rolling Stone Press. ISBN 0-394-72107-1.
- Myers, Paul (2007). Barenaked Ladies: Public Stunts, Private Stories. Simon and Schuster. ISBN 978-1-4165-8736-1.
- Priore, Domenic (1995). Look, Listen, Vibrate, Smile!. Last Gap. ISBN 0-86719-417-0.
- Priore, Domenic (2005). Smile: The Story of Brian Wilson's Lost Masterpiece. London: Sanctuary. ISBN 1860746276.
- Sanchez, Luis (2014). The Beach Boys' Smile. Bloomsbury Publishing. ISBN 978-1-62356-956-3.
- Schinder, Scott (2007). "The Beach Boys". In Schinder, Scott; Schwartz, Andy (eds.). Icons of Rock: An Encyclopedia of the Legends Who Changed Music Forever. Westport, Connecticut: Greenwood Press. ISBN 978-0313338458.
