= Summer Dreams: The Story of the Beach Boys =

- Based on: Heroes and Villains by Steven Gaines
- Written by: Charles Rosin
- Directed by: Michael Switzer
- Starring: Bruce Greenwood; Greg Kean; Arlen Dean Snyder; Casey Sander; Bo Foxworth; Linda Doná; Laura Leigh Hughes; Andrew Myler; Diane Gaidry
- Composer: Jay Levy
- Country of origin: United States
- Original language: English

Production
- Producer: Jay Fields
- Cinematography: Paul Onorato
- Editor: Mark W. Rosenbaum
- Running time: 96 minutes
- Production company: Leonard Hill Films

Original release
- Network: ABC
- Release: April 29, 1990

Summer Dreams: The Story of the Beach Boys is a 1990 biographical TV movie directed by Michael Switzer. The film was based on the 1986 book Heroes and Villains: The True Story of the Beach Boys by Steven Gaines. It was originally broadcast as part of The ABC Sunday Night Movie series on April 29, 1990.

== Plot ==
In the early 1960s, Dennis and his brothers Brian and Carl Wilson grow up under the eye of their father, Murry. Dennis convinces Brian to write songs in his own style rather than conform to Murry's expectations. When Murry and his wife Audree go on vacation, Murry gives the brothers $100 in food money. Dennis encourages Brian and Carl, along with their cousin Mike Love, and friend Al Jardine, to rent instruments and start their own group. Murry is unimpressed by the boys' expenditure, but when the Pendletones demonstrate Brian and Mike's new song "Surfin'", he recognizes their potential and organizes a record deal for them. The record company changes the group's name to the Beach Boys. Murry becomes their manager and pushes them in pursuit of success. He demands perfection from the group, and frequently criticizes their singing. Dennis gets into a fight with Murry during a recording session and is fired. Brian finds Dennis drinking on the beach, who tells him he has to learn to defend himself from Murry as well. Brian convinces Murry to let Dennis back into the band and moves out of his parents' house.

Mike and Brian are inspired to write "Fun, Fun, Fun" after watching Dennis get into his new girlfriend's car. The Beach Boys debut the song live at Carl's suggestion when Murry claims it "won't sell". After the concert, Brian meets Marilyn Rovell, while Dennis meets Carole, a waitress whom he later marries. Brian grows insecure about the group's popularity in the wake of the British Invasion, and writes "I Get Around" when Dennis suggests that he can't write a number one song. During a vocal session for the song, Brian has enough of Murry's continued interference and fires him. The Beach Boys' constant touring takes a toll on Brian, and he begins smoking marijuana to cope with the stress. After having a nervous breakdown on an airplane, he tells the other Beach Boys that he plans to stop touring and focus on writing music.

While the Beach Boys are on another tour, Brian devotes himself to composing "the greatest rock 'n' roll album ever made". Carole divorces Dennis when she discovers his infidelity. The group enters a slump when their new recordings prove to be unsuccessful, and Brian becomes depressed. Dennis befriends Charles Manson and later confides in Murry when he finds out about Manson's participation in the Tate-LaBianca murders. Murry sells Brian's songs for $700,000, believing the Beach Boys' music is no longer relevant.

Dennis builds a relationship with his new girlfriend, Karen. When Murry dies, Carl urges Dennis and Brian to attend his funeral, but neither show up. Marilyn hires Eugene Landy to be Brian's therapist. Dennis and Karen break up after they cheat on each other. Several months later, Dennis sees Brian out jogging and entices him with fast food and cocaine to encourage his creativity. They discuss how their father's behavior has affected them. Brian returns to touring with the Beach Boys, who have since regained their popularity and become a nostalgia act. Mike fires Dennis from the band after he solicits drugs from the audience.

Dennis meets Shawn at a party, who claims to be Mike's daughter. The couple marry and have a son, Gage, but the marriage proves to be tumultuous. Dennis is allowed back into the Beach Boys as long as he stays sober. Brian is again under Landy's supervision after having dropped him several years before. Dennis declines Brian's offer of treatment from Landy. Dennis reconciles with Karen, who asks him to be there for his family. He returns home to find Shawn and Gage gone, and starts drinking again. Shortly after, a drunk Dennis tells his friends that he plans to enter a detox program. He jumps into the ocean and retrieves a photo of himself and Karen he threw into the marina when they broke up. Dennis dives back down to look for more items, but fails to resurface. Carl tells Brian he must learn how to face Dennis' death. At the following year's Fourth of July concert in Washington, DC, Brian takes the microphone and dedicates the group's performance to Dennis.

== Cast ==
- Bruce Greenwood as Dennis Wilson
- Greg Kean as Brian Wilson
- Arlen Dean Snyder as Murry Wilson
- Casey Sander as Mike Love
- Bo Foxworth as Carl Wilson
- Linda Doná as Karen
- Laura Leigh Hughes as Carole
- Wendy Kaplan as Marilyn Rovell
- Dorothy Dells as Audree Wilson
- Andrew Myler as Al Jardine
- Billy Vera as Sal
- Robert E. Lee as Bruce Johnston
- Diane Gaidry as Shawn
- Michael Reid MacKay as Charles Manson

== Songs ==
The following Beach Boys songs appear in the film:

- "Surfin' U.S.A."
- "Surfin'"
- "Surfin' Safari"
- "Barbara Ann"
- "In My Room"
- "Fun, Fun, Fun"
- "Surfer Girl"
- "I Get Around"
- "California Girls"
- "God Only Knows"
- "Rock and Roll Music"

All songs used in the film were soundalike recordings.

== Production ==
The film was unauthorized by the Beach Boys, who were against the film being made. The group's manager Tom Hulett told the Los Angeles Times, "We don't want to help them get any publicity, and we are refusing to license (to them) any of the music we can control."

Filming began November 20, 1989, and wrapped the following month. Arlen Dean Snyder was hired to play the role of Murry Wilson based on his singing ability. Before the film aired, Bruce Greenwood stated, "All the actors cared really deeply about how we were representing these people. We tried to stay away from making it a lighthearted, meaningless romp or a heavy judgmental thing."

== Reception ==
The film placed 48th in the weekly ratings for April 23-29, 1990, where it received a Nielsen rating of 10.6. The film aired against the TV movies Fall from Grace on NBC and Caroline? on CBS.

John J. O'Connor of the New York Times News Service wrote the film was "a numbing exercise in waste." Mark Dawidziak called the film "the tabloid version of the band's professional and private problems" and wrote, "If the Beach Boys are furious over "Summer Dreams," you can hardly blame them. ABC has turned them into silly rock goons worthy more of laughter than sympathy." Howard Rosenberg of the Los Angeles Times wrote the film was "such a chaotic jumble that all you know for sure is that the surf's up", but praised Greenwood, Kean, and Snyder's performances.

Steven Gaines later said he hated the film and wrote, "I had no say in it, and the producers did a lousy job."
