= The Love You Make =

1983 book by Peter Brown

- First edition (US)
- Author: Peter Brown; Steven Gaines
- Language: English
- Subject: The Beatles
- Publisher: Macmillan (UK); McGraw-Hill (US)
- Publication date: February 1983
- Publication place: United Kingdom
- Pages: 448; 393 (Pan version)
- ISBN: 0-07-008159-X; ISBN 0-330-28531-9 (Pan)

The Love You Make: An Insider's Story of the Beatles is a 1983 book by Peter Brown and Steven Gaines. Brown was personal assistant to the Beatles' manager, Brian Epstein, a senior executive at Apple Corps, as well as best man to John Lennon at the latter's wedding to Yoko Ono in March 1969.

== Book content ==
In a 1983 interview, Peter Brown said that, having turned down all previous offers to share his recollections of the Beatles, he had decided to write a book in 1979 because of the many inaccurate accounts that had been published. He said he contacted the four former band members that year, and that they each agreed "it was a good idea to do a definitive book once and for all and get it all over [with]; then we could forget about it."

The Love You Make covers the period from the Beatles' teenage years, through Beatlemania and the group's break-up, until after Lennon's murder in December 1980. A large portion of the text is devoted to Lennon and Epstein, particularly to the latter's homosexuality. Brown presents an at-times unflattering picture of the individual Beatles; he depicts Lennon as lacking in kindness, belittles George Harrison's quest for spiritual enlightenment, and portrays Paul McCartney as self-serving and insincere. In his overview of the most popular books about the group, in The Rough Guide to the Beatles, Chris Ingham writes that Brown's account focuses on "the seamier side of The Beatles' story" and was viewed as being "nothing short of betrayal" by the surviving former band members.

== Publication ==
The Love You Make was published in the United States in February 1983. Late in January, as a result of one of Brown's revelations, the British tabloid The Sun published an article about McCartney having fathered an illegitimate child in 1964 – a story about which the press had long been aware but had previously lacked corroboration. After Brown sent a copy of his book to Paul and Linda McCartney, the couple ceremoniously burnt it, with Linda photographing the event.

According to author and critic Kenneth Womack, the book attracted "considerable controversy" due to its "unvarnished, gossip-laden narrative about the Beatles' private lives", a reaction that he likens to that created by Albert Goldman's 1988 biography The Lives of John Lennon. Beatles fans took to calling Brown's book The Muck You Rake. Its accuracy has been challenged by another former Beatles insider, Ken Mansfield, in his 2000 memoir The Beatles, the Bible and Bodega Bay.

The Love You Make was reissued in 2002 by New American Library, with minor revisions and a foreword by Rolling Stone journalist Anthony DeCurtis. Speaking to New York magazine, Brown explained his decision to re-publish, saying that he had read a review of the Beatles Anthology book that mentioned "other Beatle books and not mine. And I got pissed off."

== Critical reception ==
In a contemporary review, People magazine described the book as "Fabulous, revolting and depressing by turns" and "hard to ignore", saying that it "rank[s] in breadth if not malodorous spirit" with Goldman's 1981 biography of Elvis Presley, Elvis. The reviewer concluded: "The Love You Make is about an entire generation's loss of innocence – the Beatles lost theirs long ago, and their fans, at least those who believe Brown and Gaines' version of events – can lose theirs now." Kirkus Reviews considered the book "long, unfocused" and written in "sleazily faceless journalese", adding: "Throughout, the preoccupation is with the Beatles' private lives (women, drugs), with the neurotic miseries of homosexual manager Epstein, and with business deals; the music is secondary at best." The writer continued: "The attempts at psychological insight are hackneyed, the tone is alternately muckraking and platitudinous. So, though some readers will appreciate the petty anecdotes and tacky details here, most will want to stick with Philip Norman's Shout! …"

New Yorker journalist Mark Hertsgaard described The Love You Make as a "kiss-and-tell recounting of the Beatles story", although he noted that the authors' claims regarding an alleged longstanding homosexual relationship between Epstein and Lennon were "less salacious and sweeping" than Goldman's later statements in The Lives of John Lennon. Publishers Weekly welcomed the 2002 reissue, saying that Brown "recreates the well-known saga of Beatlemania but does it dispassionately enough to make it interesting". While noting that much of the content had become "pretty familiar", the reviewer admired it as "a dramatically good story and Brown catches us with the headiness of it all".

Authors Stuart Shea and Robert Rodriguez criticise Brown for the inaccuracy of his account, which included recollections of episodes "he could not possibly have been privy to", and for exaggerating his importance in the Beatles' history. According to Shea and Rodriguez, the former Beatles aide and his co-author were "clearly more interested in selling books than presenting a balanced, accurate portrait … Brown certainly would not have dared to present such salacious pap in John Lennon's lifetime and market it as an 'insider's story.'" Chris Ingham similarly considers that Lennon and Epstein "would undoubtedly have felt let down" by Brown's book.
