= The Beach Boys and the California Myth =

1978 book about the Beach Boys

- Author: David Leaf
- Language: English
- Subject: The Beach Boys
- Publisher: Grosset & Dunlap
- Publication date: 1978
- Publication place: United States
- Pages: 192
- ISBN: 978-0448146256
- OCLC: 4333916

The Beach Boys and the California Myth is a 1978 biography of the Beach Boys that was written by the American author David Leaf, editor and creator of the Pet Sounds fanzine. It was the first full-length book written about the band and an early piece of writing that revealed much of their internal conflicts and family history.

The book was influential in cementing a popular narrative of the band – one that caricatured Brian Wilson as a tortured genius. Later biographies, including Heroes and Villains (1986) and Catch a Wave (2006), drew heavily from Leaf's book. Revised editions have been published in 1985 as The Beach Boys and in 2022 as God Only Knows: The Story of Brian Wilson, the Beach Boys and the California Myth.

== Background ==
While living in New Rochelle, New York, Leaf developed a fascination with the Beach Boys after reading Tom Nolan and David Felton's 1971 Rolling Stone cover story on the band, "The Beach Boys: A California Saga". Following his college graduation in 1975, Leaf moved to Los Angeles with the ambition of authoring a book about Brian Wilson. After forming connections with the group, in 1977 he started a fanzine named after their 1966 album Pet Sounds. The fanzine led to a publishing contract with Grosset & Dunlap to write The Beach Boys and the California Myth.

== Content ==
=== Original edition ===
I came to California to test the myth, to meet the Beach Boys, looking for symbols. It wasn't long before my journey went too far. My journalistic investigations and excavations discovered more human suffering than I really wanted to know.

— Excerpt from the book's introduction

The book marked the first "serious study" devoted to Wilson's music, with photos and clippings interspersed throughout. Substantial coverage is devoted to the Wilson brothers' upbringing and Brian's formative musical influences. Leaf characterizes Brian during his adolescence as an affable personality who was popular with his schoolmates, although shy and prone to follow the crowds to avoid social conflicts.

Throughout the book, Leaf advances the argument that Brian had been victimized and artistically stifled by his record company and his bandmates. He writes, "If Brian sought refuge within drugs, in reaction to all the pressure, then everybody must share the blame—the record company, the family, the Beach Boys, and Brian’s entourage." The book contains negative depictions of Mike Love and Wilson's first wife Marilyn, as well as details concerning the odd circumstances surrounding the band's Smile sessions. Leaf draws upon new interviews with former Brother Records president David Anderle and many others who were quoted anonymously.

=== Later editions ===
A revised edition, titled The Beach Boys, was published in 1985. In this revision, Leaf penned an essay titled "Shades of Grey" in which he wrote that he "no longer indict[s] the world of 'being bad to Brian,' when it's apparent that Brian has been hardest on himself."

In June 2022, a second revised 480-page edition was published by Omnibus Press as God Only Knows: The Story of Brian Wilson, the Beach Boys and the California Myth. It contains new forewords by Jimmy Webb, Barry Gibb, and Melinda Wilson.

== Influence and reception ==
=== First and second editions ===
Writing in 2006, The Guardian's Campbell Stevenson referred to California Myth as a "matchless" biography that "overshadows any book that documents the group's most successful years." Similarly in 2012, biographer Mark Dillon wrote that while the book remained "long out-of-print and succeeded by other bios about Brian and the group, its shadow looms over them all." Steven Gaines' 1986 biography Heroes and Villains drew heavily on Leaf's book. In Peter Ames Carlin's 2006 book about Brian Wilson, Catch a Wave, he described California Myth as "near-Shakespearean" in its telling of "innocence, hope, greed, and brutality", and an enlightenment of "the depth and wonder of Brian's work".

Some reviewers found that Brian's bandmates, especially Mike Love, were marginalized in the original edition. Rock critic Richie Unterberger decreed, "If there is a flaw to Leaf's writing, it's that its praise of Brian Wilson is often unabashed, and his dominant creative role in the group arguably overstated." Music historian Luis Sanchez argued that Leaf's book presented a reductive view of the band's music being "meaningful exclusively in terms of Brian Wilson's genius", although he applauded the addition of "Shades of Grey" in the 1985 edition, for it "adds some valuable insight to Leaf's original narrative, allowing it some breathing room where it seemed stifled and strict before."

In its significance to the band's mythology, Sanchez referred to the book as the first work that "put the 'Brian Wilson is a genius' trope into perspective", especially by emphasizing a "dynamic of good guys and bad guys." Sanchez concludes, "What we end up with is an image of young Brian as something of a Norman Rockwell cipher—essentially suburban yet somewhat inscrutable."

=== Beach Boys' response ===
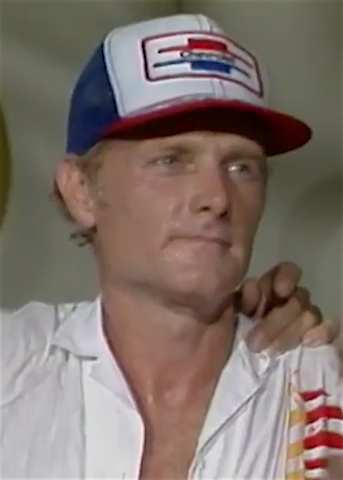
Mike Love (pictured 1983) criticized the book's negative depiction of himself and Wilson's family and friends.

Leaf added in the 1985 appendix that when he later saw Mike Love at a Beach Boys fan convention, Love "tried to burn a hole in my head with an endless, icy stare, and began his speech with acerbic remarks so obviously aimed at me that all heads in the room turned to see my reaction." Love referred to the biography in his 2016 memoir, Good Vibrations, where he criticized it for solidifying a narrative that vilified himself, his bandmates, and other members of Wilson's family. He named Leaf "the first" in a line of Wilson's "awestruck biographers".

=== 2022 edition ===
Reviewing God Only Knows for The Spill Magazine, Ljubinko Zivkovic wrote that the update is "exactly the place where [newcomers] should start with The Beach Boys and Brian Wilson sagas." John Visconti of Culture Sonar called the book "an immersive, thoughtful, and incisive biography of Brian and the Beach Boys [and] a perceptive and emotionally-centered look at [his] complex genius".

Goldmine contributor Gillian G. Gaar deemed the book "required reading", however, she bemoaned that Leaf "treads more carefully in discussing Beach Boys matters in the updates", surmising that it "may be due in part to Leaf's wariness about provoking more controversy."

== Bibliography ==
- Carlin, Peter Ames (2006). Catch a Wave: The Rise, Fall, and Redemption of the Beach Boys' Brian Wilson. Rodale. ISBN 978-1-59486-320-2.
- Dillon, Mark (2012). Fifty Sides of the Beach Boys: The Songs That Tell Their Story. ECW Press. ISBN 978-1-77090-198-8.
- Granata, Charles L. (2003). Wouldn't It Be Nice: Brian Wilson and the Making of the Beach Boys' Pet Sounds. ISBN 9781556525070.
- Love, Mike (2016). Good Vibrations: My Life as a Beach Boy. Penguin Publishing Group. ISBN 978-0-698-40886-9.
- Sanchez, Luis (2014). The Beach Boys' Smile. Bloomsbury Publishing. ISBN 978-1-62356-956-3.
