= Vosse =

Vosse is a Dutch surname. Notable people with the surname include:

- Michael Vosse (1941–2014), American music journalist and publicist
- Vincent Vosse (born 1972), Belgian race car driver
