= Michael Vosse =

American journalist and publicist

- Vosse, 1966
- Born: May 20, 1941
- Died: January 20, 2014 (aged 72)
- Occupations: Writer, journalist, publicist

Michael Vosse (May 20, 1941 – January 20, 2014) was an American journalist and A&M Records publicist. He is best known as assistant to Brian Wilson during the formation of the Beach Boys' Brother Records and the recording of the album Smile (1966–67). His work also included limited time serving as a television producer, and narrator.

== Background ==
Vosse's father was a man who printed one of the first books in the United States about the drug LSD. Early in his professional life, Vosse was a television production assistant who acted as a liaison between record companies, musicians, other artists, and "the underground". In college, he was friends with David Anderle, who later became the first head of the Beach Boys' company Brother Records. According to Beach Boys biographer Steven Gaines, Vosse was also "a part-time stringer" for the journalist Jules Siegel.

== Association with Brian Wilson ==
Vosse was introduced to Brian Wilson by Smile lyricist Van Dyke Parks. Beach Boys publicist Derek Taylor arranged for Vosse, then a magazine reporter, to interview Wilson for the forthcoming release of their late 1966 single "Good Vibrations". The day after their meeting, Wilson called Vosse and offered him a job recording sounds of nature. During this time, Vosse appeared with Wilson on The Lloyd Thaxton Show, with Wilson speaking about the benefits of eating vegetables.

The Beach Boys terminated their employment of Vosse in March 1967, as Wilson's bandmates resented the fact that they had been paying the salary of an aide who worked solely for Wilson. In 1969, Vosse penned an article for Fusion that expounded on his side of the Smile story, and in 2004, he appeared in the documentary Beautiful Dreamer: Brian Wilson and the Story of Smile.

== Later career ==
Following his association with the Beach Boys, Vosse worked for the Monterey Pop Festival committee, and then as an assistant to the vice president of A&M Records, and was involved with the Flying Burrito Brothers. He was assigned by the label to accompany them during their infamous cross-country tour in the late 1960s. In 1987, Vosse wrote, produced and narrated the television special "The Music Never Stopped" for KGO-TV.

== Death ==
Vosse died on January 20, 2014.
