= I'm Your Man: The Life of Leonard Cohen =

I'm Your Man: The Life of Leonard Cohen is a biography of Leonard Cohen written by Sylvie Simmons and published by Ecco in 2012 (paperback 2013).

== Reviews ==
- "'I'm Your Man,' Leonard Cohen Biography by Sylvie Simmons". NYT. 13 September 2012.
- New York Times Sunday Book Review by AM Holmes, October 12, 2012
- The Telegraph by Bernadette McNulty, November 14, 2012
- The Observer by Kitty Empire, Saturday, November 24, 2012
