= Heroes and Villains: The True Story of the Beach Boys =

1986 book by Steven Gaines

- Author: Steven Gaines
- Language: English
- Subject: The Beach Boys
- Genre: Biography
- Publisher: New American Library
- Publication date: 1986
- Publication place: United States
- Pages: 374
- OCLC: 925142707

Heroes and Villains: The True Story of the Beach Boys is a 1986 book by American journalist Steven Gaines that covers the history of the Beach Boys. The contents are focused on the band members' private lives and personal struggles, with little commentary reserved for the music itself. Coverage spans the group's early years to Dennis Wilson's death in 1983. It was the third major biography written about the band, following David Leaf's The Beach Boys and the California Myth (1978) and Byron Preiss' The Beach Boys (1979).

== Reception ==
Reviewing the book for the Los Angeles Times, Don Waller wrote,

Unfortunately, Gaines’ concern for documenting the group’s rather well-known excesses comes at the expense of the Beach Boys’ music--much of which remains deservedly popular today--as evidenced by the volume’s lack not only of a discography but also any meaningful, original or even critical insight into the only reason anyone cares about these people in the first place. Instead, Gaines chooses to inform his readers that families are capable of inflicting untold horrors upon one another, that the mantle of genius may turn out to be a crown of thorns, that too much freedom can be hazardous to one’s health and that, in general, rock ‘n’ roll stardom is a fate you wouldn’t wish upon your worst enemy.

Chicago Reader's James Jones described the biography as a "merciless", "detailed", and "lurid account of rock-star excess that manages to be even-handed by leaving no one unscathed but seldom articulates the beauty of the band's music." In 2004, another writer for the Los Angeles Times referred to it as "the definitive Beach Boys book".

== Film adaptation ==
In 1990, Heroes and Villains was adapted into the ABC television film Summer Dreams: The Story of the Beach Boys. Gaines later commented that he had no involvement with the film and thought "the producers did a lousy job."
