= Beautiful Dreamer: Brian Wilson and the Story of Smile =

Beautiful Dreamer: Brian Wilson and the Story of SMiLE
- Promotional DVD cover
- Directed by: David Leaf
- Release date: October 5, 2004
- Running time: 109 minutes
- Language: English

Beautiful Dreamer: Brian Wilson and the Story of SMiLE is a 2004 documentary film directed by David Leaf about Brian Wilson, the Beach Boys' unfinished Smile album, and the making of Brian Wilson Presents Smile.

== Overview ==
The documentary was shot between late 2003 and August 2004 and includes interviews with Wilson and dozens of his associates, albeit none of his surviving bandmates from the Beach Boys, who declined to appear in the film. It also includes contributions from Elvis Costello, Burt Bacharach, and Roger Daltrey. The title takes its name from the 19th century Stephen Foster song "Beautiful Dreamer"; its opening lyrics begin with the phrase "beautiful dreamer wake", the same initials as the documentary's subject, Brian Douglas Wilson, who references this coincidence in the film.

The film is divided in three segments: a history of the Beach Boys' original Smile album, its rebirth as Brian Wilson Presents Smile, and the album's 2004 live performances. It originally premiered on the network Showtime before being bundled as an extra on the DVD for the 2005 concert film Brian Wilson Presents Smile.

== Cast ==
- Brian Wilson
- Van Dyke Parks
- Melinda Ledbetter-Wilson
- Danny Hutton
- David Anderle
- Michael Vosse
- Lorren Daro
- Darian Sahanaja
- David Oppenheim (archival)
- Tony Asher
- Carol Kaye
- Hal Blaine
- Elvis Costello
- Lou Adler
- George Martin
- Burt Bacharach
- Paul McCartney
- Roger Daltrey
- Jeff Bridges
