= Shout!: The Beatles in Their Generation =

1981 book by Philip Norman

- First edition cover
- Author: Philip Norman
- Language: English
- Subject: The Beatles
- Genre: Biography
- Publisher: MJF Books
- Publication date: 1981

Shout!: The Beatles in Their Generation (also published as Shout!: The True Story of the Beatles) is a book written by journalist Philip Norman that chronicles the history of the English rock band the Beatles. The book was published by MJF Books in 1981, and later editions have been published by Pan Macmillan and Simon & Schuster.

Shout! became a bestselling book and received a favourable reception for its content, including its coverage of the Beatles' Hamburg era, although detractors have bemoaned its negative tone and questionable sources. Norman later wrote that Paul McCartney had taken to calling the book Shite. Its claims and interpretations have since been largely contradicted by subsequent Beatles-related biographies, reference books and memoirs.

== Reception ==
Shout! was a bestselling book upon release in 1981, and has since sold over a million copies. Randolph Hogan of The New York Times described Shout! as "the definitive biography [of the Beatles] – comprehensive, intelligent, sensitively written and exhaustively researched", while the Chicago Sun-Times lauded it as "the best, most detailed, and most serious biography of the Beatles and their time".

In his review of the book in The Rough Guide to the Beatles (2006), Chris Ingham writes that Norman displays a "clear dislike" for McCartney yet Shout! merits the praise it has received, due to "the rigour of its research and insightful reflection of the times". Writing in 2005, Beatles biographer Ian MacDonald said that Norman's book "remains the sharpest account of The Beatles' career". In 2017, Sibbie O'Sullivan of The Washington Post called the book "well-respected".

In 2017, critic Stephen Thomas Erlewine highlighted Shout! as an essential Beatles book, although one that draws primarily from interviewees who "were ready to settle scores while keeping the fires of the Beatles' myth alight". In 2020, Colin Fleming of Rolling Stone ranked the book seventh on his list of the "10 Best Beatles Books", writing: "The knock on this Philip Norman bio has always been that he looks down on his subjects, but ... the most compelling Beatles books tend to be the ones that you can have a mental punch-up over, disagreeing with a given take, but enjoying it all the same because it makes you think, or sends you back to reevaluate something."

== Criticism ==
Paul McCartney voiced his objections to Norman's unfavourable portrayal of him in Shout! as a "great manipulator". Norman later recalled that he had heard that McCartney had taken to calling the book Shite. In a 1988 interview, music journalist Mark Ellen asked George Harrison what he thought of Norman's characterisation of the four Beatles and of his suggestion that Harrison had learned the sitar because he was "desperate to have some identity" within the group. Harrison replied that Norman understood nothing about the Beatles' history and had missed the overlapping aspects of the band members' personalities, adding that he "wrote that book because he was desperate to have an identity is probably closer to the truth".

By the 2010s, Norman had largely abandoned the narrative promoted by Shout! Writing in her 2016 book The Beatles and the Historians, Erin Torkelson Weber said:

Certain aspects of Shout! continue to influence Beatles historiography. However, by the beginning of the 21st century major elements of the Shout! narrative were no longer unquestionably accepted as the prevailing Orthodoxy, and The Beatles Bibliography condemned its close-minded and inaccurate doctrine ... The vast majority of sources which emerged between the wake of Lennon's murder and the 21st century painted a far more nuanced picture of the Beatles, their music, and their breakup than the one Norman provided in Shout! Multiple biographies, reference books, eyewitness accounts and memoirs contradicted many of Norman's ... conclusions and interpretations.
