= Peter Brown (music manager) =

American-based English businessman

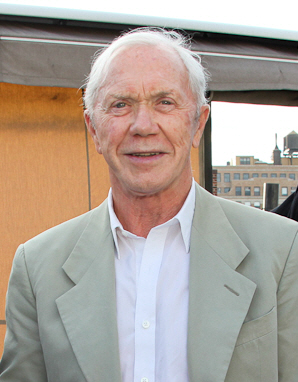
- Brown in 2012
- Occupations: Manager of the Beatles, Founder of BLJ Worldwide

Peter Brown is an American-based English businessman. After Brian Epstein recruited Brown to run the Epstein's music store in Liverpool, he became part of the Beatles' management team. He remained Epstein's and the Beatles' personal assistant until the band's dissolution. He helped found and served as a board member of Apple Corps and assumed Epstein's duties after the manager's death. He went on to establish several companies and resides in New York City.

== Early life ==
Brown was born in 1937, and grew up in Bebington, Cheshire, in a middle-class Roman Catholic family. He completed his national service in the RAF before starting work for the Lewis's department store in his early twenties.

== Career ==
=== The Beatles ===
When the Epsteins opened a second store at 12–14 Whitechapel in Liverpool and put Brian Epstein in charge of the entire operation, Epstein often walked across the road to the Lewis's department store (which also had a music section), where Brown was employed. He watched Brown's sales technique and was impressed enough to lure Brown to work for NEMS with the offer of a higher salary and a commission on sales. Brown became a confidant to the Epstein family and ran the music store for Epstein before becoming part of the Beatles' management team. Brown was Epstein's and the Beatles' personal assistant during the 1960s, becoming Epstein's personal assistant in 1966 – prior to this his job role was officially ''personnel manager.'' He was one of few to have direct contact with each Beatle, traveling worldwide with the band members and knowing their daily whereabouts.

Brown served as a board member and COO of Apple Corps, the Beatles' company, which he helped establish, alongside operating Beatles and Co. After Epstein's death, Brown assumed many of the day-to-day management duties Epstein had performed.

Brown was witness to the wedding of Paul and Linda McCartney and best man and witness at the wedding of John Lennon and Yoko Ono during 1969, after arranging for the couple to be wed in Gibraltar in order to avoid legal restrictions. Lennon mentioned Brown in a line from "The Ballad of John and Yoko" ("Peter Brown called to say 'You can make it OK, you can get married in Gibraltar near Spain'"), one of the last Beatles singles. After the takeover of Apple Corps by Allan Klein, Brown handed in his resignation New Year's Eve 1969, after being asked to fire several close friends.

=== Post-Beatles Career ===
After the Beatles disbanded in 1970, Brown became president and chief executive officer of the Robert Stigwood Organisation. In 1977, Brown formed the Entertainment Development Company. He founded Brown & Powers, a global public relations firm in 1983, which became Brown and Argus in 1994, Brown Lloyd James in 1996, and BLJ Worldwide in 2012.

BLJ Worldwide has been implicated in a number of controversies since its inception – particularly due to the companies' alleged anti western stance and involvement in Middle Eastern politics – first revealed to the wider public eye after Brown chose to defend his work for the family of Colonel Gadhafi in a 2011 Financial Times article. Other instances of alleged misconduct on behalf of BLJ include the firm's involvement in the controversial Vogue cover shoot featuring then Syrian First Lady Asma Al-Assad and allegations of sabotage during the selection process for the 2022 FIFA World Cup on behalf of the Qatari government.

Brown is chairman emeritus of Literacy Partners, a member of the US Steering Committee for the Duke of Edinburgh's Award, a member of the board for British American Business, a member of the selection committee of the Lee Strasberg Artistic Achievement Award, and a board member of the American Associates of the National Theatre of Great Britain.

Brown and co-author Steven Gaines wrote The Love You Make: An Insider's Story of The Beatles, a biography of the band published in 1983. In 2024 Brown and Gaines released their second book All You Need is Love: The End of The Beatles, a collection of interview transcripts recorded for the production of their previous book. The 2024 book also features general contextual commentary from both authors and an introductory chapter written by Brown.
