= Philip Norman (author) =

English author and journalist

- Born: 13 April 1943 (age 83)
- Occupation: Journalist; biographer; novelist; playwright
- Period: 1965–present
- Subject: Rock music
- Notable works: Shout!: The Beatles in Their Generation

Philip Norman (born 13 April 1943) is an English author, novelist, journalist and playwright. He is best known for his biographies of the Beatles, the Rolling Stones, Buddy Holly, and Elton John. His other books include similar studies of John Lennon, Mick Jagger, Paul McCartney, and Eric Clapton.

== Early years ==
Norman was born in London but grew up in Ryde, on the Isle of Wight. He attended Ryde School, and his father, Clive Norman, ran the Seagull Ballroom on Ryde Pier. He describes his childhood in the book Babycham Night. Relatives of his produced the sparkling perry of that name in Shepton Mallet.

== Career ==
=== Journalism ===
Norman began working as a staff writer for The Sunday Times in 1965. In addition to writing the newspaper's Atticus column, he gained notice during the late 1960s and over the following decade for his profiles of public figures such as Elizabeth Taylor, P. G. Wodehouse and Muammar Gaddafi, and of musical artists, including James Brown, Little Richard, the Beach Boys, Fleetwood Mac, Rod Stewart and the Everly Brothers.

Another of his assignments was to investigate and report on the problems afflicting the Beatles' multimedia company Apple Corps. In the 1970s, he also worked as The Times' rock music critic.

=== As author and novelist ===
==== Shout! ====
Norman's first book, Shout!: The Beatles in Their Generation, also published as Shout!: The True Story of the Beatles, was published in 1981, with later revisions. An immediate bestseller, it has since sold over a million copies. The New York Times described Shout! as "the definitive biography [of the Beatles] – comprehensive, intelligent, sensitively written and exhaustively researched", while the Chicago Sun-Times admired it as "The best, most detailed, and most serious biography of the Beatles and their time."

The book portrays Paul McCartney in an unfavourable light, and the former Beatle voiced his objections to Norman's characterisation of him as "the great manipulator". Norman later recalled that when promoting Shout! on the television show Good Morning America in May 1981, he described Lennon as having represented "three-quarters of the Beatles" and was rewarded with an invitation to visit Lennon's widow, Yoko Ono. Norman also recalled that he had heard that McCartney had taken to calling the book Shite!

In his review of the most popular books about the group, in The Rough Guide to the Beatles, Chris Ingham writes that Norman displays a "clear dislike" for McCartney yet Shout! merits the praise it has received, due to "the rigour of its research and insightful reflection of the times". Writing in 2005, Beatles biographer Ian MacDonald said that Norman's book "remains the sharpest account of The Beatles' career" and suggested that its anti-McCartney sentiments were balanced by the 1997 publication of Barry Miles' Paul McCartney: Many Years from Now.

==== Further writing and opinions on the Beatles ====
Norman was interviewed in 1987 for a feature on George Harrison on the show West 57th, during which he stated that Harrison's view of the Beatles' history was the only reliable first-hand account, given Lennon's death seven years before. When asked for an explanation, Norman said that McCartney "rewrites history all the time" and Ringo Starr was unable to remember: "He doesn't know. He just... he drank, he smoked the joints, he had the girls and he drummed the drums... that was Ringo".

Reporting on the British media's reaction to Harrison's death in November 2001, Spencer Leigh wrote that "the only sour note" had come from a piece written by Norman in The Sunday Times. According to Leigh, Norman's article "tore away at Harrison's memory" by branding him "a serial philanderer" and denigrating his standing as a humanitarian.

In October 2008, Norman's 800-page book John Lennon: The Life was released to some controversy. According to Sean O'Hagan of The Observer, the tone of the book falls midway between the "extravagantly spiteful" narrative of Albert Goldman's 1988 biography The Lives of John Lennon and the "respectful, going-on adulatory" message of Ray Coleman's Lennon: The Definitive Biography, published in 1984. O'Hagan reported that Ono and McCartney, both of whom had co-operated with Norman during the book's creation, were displeased with the result.

Norman's book on McCartney, titled Paul McCartney: The Biography, was published in 2016. His book on Brian Epstein, Mr. Moonlight: Brian Epstein and the Making of the Beatles, was published in 2026.

==== Other works ====
Norman has also published what the music journalism website Rock's Backpages describes as "definitive biographies" of Buddy Holly, the Rolling Stones and Elton John. Additionally, Norman has authored six works of fiction, and two plays: The Man That Got Away and Words of Love.

== Published biographies ==
- Shout!: The True Story of the Beatles (1981), ISBN 0-241-10300-2, 0-241-10631-1
- Symphony for the Devil: The Rolling Stones Story (1984), ISBN 0-671-44975-3
- The Life and Good Times of the Rolling Stones (1989), Century
- Days in the life: John Lennon Remembered (1990), ISBN 0-7126-3922-5
- The Stones (1993, updated w/ a new afterword), Penguin
- Elton or Elton John (1991), ISBN 0-09-174838-0 or ISBN 0-517-58762-9
- Shout!: The Beatles in their Generation (1996), ISBN 0-684-83067-1
- Buddy: The Biography (1997), ISBN 0-684-83560-6 or ISBN 0-330-35223-7
- Sir Elton: The Definitive Biography (2001), ISBN 0-7867-0820-4
- The Stones: The Acclaimed Biography (2002), ISBN 0-330-48057-X
- John Lennon: The Life (2008), ISBN 0-06-075401-X
- Mick Jagger (2012), ISBN 94-004-0204-X (15)
- Paul McCartney: The Biography (2016), ISBN 978-0060754013
- Slowhand: The Life and Music of Eric Clapton (2018), ISBN 978-0316560436
- Wild Thing: The Short, Spellbinding Life of Jimi Hendrix (2020), ISBN 1631495895
- George Harrison: The Reluctant Beatle (2023), ISBN 9781982195861
- Mr. Moonlight: Brian Epstein and the Making of the Beatles. Simon & Schuster. June 2026. ISBN 978-1398542266.

== Published fiction ==
- Everyone's Gone to the Moon (1996), ISBN 9780099423911

== Sources ==
- Badman, Keith (2001). The Beatles Diary Volume 2: After the Break-Up 1970–2001. London: Omnibus Press. ISBN 978-0-7119-8307-6.
- Norman, Philip (2016). Paul McCartney: The Life. New York: Little, Brown and Company. ISBN 978-0-316-32796-1.
