= David Leaf =

American writer, producer, and director (born 1952)

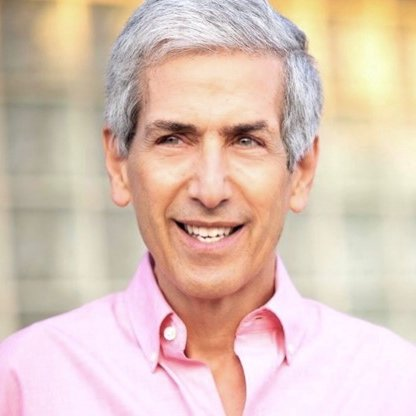
- Leaf in 2022
- Born: April 20, 1952 (age 74)
- Occupations: Writer; film and television producer; director
- Years active: 1968-present
- Website: leafprod.com

David Leaf (born April 20, 1952) is an American writer, director, and producer who is best known for his associations with Brian Wilson and the Beach Boys since the late 1970s.

Leaf's 1978 biography, The Beach Boys and the California Myth, examined the behind-the-scenes tensions and family history that had never been previously covered publicly. According to music critic Richie Unterberger, Leaf was "the first author to write extensively, and honestly, about the Beach Boys."

Leaf also wrote the first authorized biography of the Bee Gees.

His latest book, SMiLE: The Rise, Fall & Resurrection of Brian Wilson, was released on April 15, 2025.

His honors include a Peabody and WGAW award. Since 2010, Leaf has been a professor at the UCLA Herb Alpert School of Music.

== See also ==
- An All-Star Tribute to Brian Wilson
- Beautiful Dreamer: Brian Wilson and the Story of Smile
- Who Is Harry Nilsson (And Why Is Everybody Talkin' About Him)?
- The U.S. vs. John Lennon
- The Unknown Peter Sellers
