= Steven Gaines =

American author, journalist, and radio show host

- Born: 1946 (age 79–80); Borough Park, Brooklyn, New York, U.S.
- Education: Erasmus Hall High School; New York University; Temple University
- Occupations: Author, journalist, radio show host
- Writing career
- Pen name: Robert Granit
- Language: English
- Years active: 1970s–present
- Notable works: Philistines at the Hedgerow: Passion and Property in the Hamptons; The Love You Make: An Insider's Story of The Beatles; Heroes and Villains: The True Story of the Beach Boys,
- Website: stevengaines.com

Steven Gaines (born 1946) is an American author, journalist, and radio show host. His books include Philistines at the Hedgerow: Passion and Property in the Hamptons, The Love You Make: An Insider's Story of The Beatles, Heroes and Villains: The True Story of the Beach Boys, and Marjoe, the biography of evangelist Marjoe Gortner.

Gaines was a contributing editor at New York magazine and his journalism has appeared in Vanity Fair, The New York Observer, The New York Times, Los Angeles, Worth, and Connoisseur.

From 2003 to 2010 Gaines hosted a weekly, live roundtable radio interview show from the Hamptons called Sunday Brunch Live from the American Hotel in Sag Harbor that aired from Memorial Weekend to Labor Day on a local National Public Radio affiliate.

== Life ==
Gaines was born and brought up in the Borough Park section of Brooklyn, New York and attended Erasmus Hall High School and New York University, where he studied with film director Martin Scorsese. His father was a school teacher and child guidance counselor, and his mother was a bookkeeper. When he was 15 years old, after a suicide attempt because he was gay, he was voluntarily hospitalized at the Payne Whitney Psychiatric Clinic in Manhattan, which is the subject of his memoir, One of These Things First.

He graduated near the bottom of his class at Erasmus Hall, and flunked out of Temple University, in Philadelphia, Pennsylvania. It was in Philadelphia that he met children's TV star Gene London who encouraged him to write.

Gaines was working in a small auction gallery in 1971 when he met former child evangelist Marjoe Gortner at Max's Kansas City, a New York restaurant and club. Although Gaines had never published anything before he convinced Gortner to allow him to write his biography, which was published by Harper & Row (now HarperCollins) in 1973. The film of Marjoe won the 1972 Academy Award for Best Documentary, and although the film was not based on Gaines' biography, the attention brought by the Academy Award helped promote the book Marjoe into a religion bestseller and establish Gaines' career as a writer.

In 1978 Gaines met Robert Jon Cohen, a 21-year-old Studio 54 bartender, with whom he collaborated on a book called The Club, a thinly veiled roman à clef about Studio 54. The book raised the ire of nightclub owner Steve Rubell, designer Halston, and singer Liza Minnelli, among others. Fodder for the gossip columns, the book caused a sensation and got advances in the six-figures, but won Gaines ignominy. Soon after the publication of The Club, Gaines moved to Laguna Beach, California, then to London, and finally to East Hampton, New York.

== Career ==
In 1973, the same year Marjoe was published, Gaines became editor of Circus, a national teeny-bopper rock and roll magazine, and he also began a four-year run as the "Top of the Pop" columnist for the New York Sunday News, on alternate Sundays, dual positions that gave him a catbird seat in the fast lane of the rock and roll business during the golden era of the seventies. He coined the phrase "velvet mafia" in his "Top of the Pop" column — in reference to the Robert Stigwood Organization, a British record company and management group — but the term soon began to be used to describe the influential gay crowd who ran Hollywood and the fashion industry.

Gaines spent a year on the road living with Alice Cooper, and in 1976 he published Me, Alice, by Alice Cooper with Steven Gaines, the first autobiography of a rock star. Published only in hardcover, the book has since become a collector's item and sells for up to $2500 a copy.

In 1978, Gaines wrote the lyrics for two major disco hits, "New York By Night" and "Like An Eagle," performed by actor and singer Dennis Parker and composed by Village People creator Jacques Morali. In 1981, Gaines published the novel Another Runner in the Night, about a homosexual film producer married to the daughter of a studio boss, under the pen name Robert Granit.

Gaines wrote several other books about the music business. In 1983 he wrote The Love You Make: An Insider's Story of the Beatles, with Beatle insider Peter Brown. The book was on the New York Times Hardcover bestseller list for 16 weeks. In 1986, Gaines wrote Heroes and Villains, a biography of The Beach Boys, before briefly switching his focus to fashion designers, with biographies on Halston and Calvin Klein.

In 1993, Gaines co-founded the Hamptons International Film Festival. In 1998, Gaines published his social and cultural history of the East End of Long Island, Philistines at the Hedgerow: Passion and Property in the Hamptons.

In 2021, Gaines' book, Simply Halston, a 1991 biography of the fashion designer Halston, was made into a Netflix series, Halston, starring Ewan McGregor, who won the Emmy Award for Best Actor for his portrayal of the fashion designer. The Netflix series was also nominated for a Writers Guild Award for best screenplay adapted from a book.

In 2024, Gaines' book, All You Need Is Love: An Oral History of The Beatles (with Peter Brown), was nominated for a Grammy award for Best Audio book.

== Books ==
- Marjoe, the biography of evangelist Marjoe Gortner
- Me, Alice, the autobiography of rock star Alice Cooper
- Discotheque, a novel
- The Club, a novel (with Robert Jon Cohen)
- Another Runner in the Night, a novel
- The Love You Make: An Insider's Story of The Beatles (with Peter Brown)
- Heroes and Villains: The True Story of The Beach Boys
- Simply Halston: The Untold Story
- Obsession: The Lives and Times of Calvin Klein (with Sharon Churcher)
- Philistines at the Hedgerow: Passion and Property in the Hamptons
- The Sky's the Limit: Passion and Property in Manhattan
- Fool's Paradise: Players, Poseurs and the Culture of Excess in South Beach
- One of These Things First, a memoir
- All You Need Is Love: An Oral History of The Beatles (with Peter Brown)
- The Greta Garbo Home for Wayward Boys and Girls, a memoir
