= Guy Goma BBC interview =

2006 British television incident

- Guy Goma during the interview
- Date: 8 May 2006
- Venue: Television Centre, London
- Type: Interview
- Theme: Apple Corps v Apple Computer
- Filmed by: BBC News 24
- Participants: Guy Goma (interviewee); Karen Bowerman (interviewer)

On 8 May 2006, Congolese-French information technology worker Guy Goma (born 1969) was mistakenly interviewed on live television in place of technology journalist Guy Kewney. BBC News 24 presenter Karen Bowerman was scheduled to interview Kewney about the Apple Corps v Apple Computer legal dispute. Goma, who was a business studies graduate from Brazzaville in the Republic of the Congo, came to the BBC to be interviewed for a job as a data cleanser. The incident became one of the BBC's most widely reported bloopers.

== Interview ==
Guy Goma was waiting in the main reception area of the BBC Television Centre in west London to be interviewed for a job as a data support cleanser in the corporation's IT department. At the same time, Guy Kewney, a British technology expert, was in another reception area preparing for a live television interview on the subject of Apple Computer's then-recent court case with the Beatles' record label, Apple Corps. The producer sent to fetch Kewney was told that Kewney was in the main reception area. When he asked the receptionist where Guy Kewney was, she pointed to Goma, even after he asked if she was sure this was the right person.

The producer had seen a photo of Kewney, but he only had five minutes before the live interview was due to take place. He approached Goma and asked him if he was "Guy". Hearing his first name, Goma answered in the affirmative. Goma was led to the News 24 studio. BBC staff put makeup on Goma, and he was ushered to the television studio, where he was seated in front of the cameras and wired up with a microphone. Although he thought the situation was strange, he believed he was about to be interviewed for a job.

When introduced by interviewer Karen Bowerman as Internet expert Guy Kewney, Goma realised there had been a misunderstanding and was visibly shocked. Aware that he was on live television but not wishing to make a scene, Goma attempted to answer questions about Apple Corps v Apple Computer and its ramifications for the music industry as best as he could. Kewney, still in the waiting area, was shocked when he saw Goma interviewed in his place, though he was not able to hear the audio.

=== Aftermath ===
Twenty minutes after the television interview, Goma attended his job interview, which lasted ten minutes. He was not hired.

As soon as the mistake was detected, the BBC recorded an interview with Kewney for later broadcast, which was never shown. The BBC instead brought in an alternative pundit, Rupert Goodwins, for the next live slot on the topic. Afterward, Goma appeared on BBC again in a follow-up interview, during which he apologized to Kewney for taking the latter's television spot.

== Later history ==
On 16 May 2006, Goma appeared on Channel 4 News and was jokingly questioned by the presenter—introducing him as a Venezuelan citizen, a lawyer and a doctor respectively—on the topics of Hugo Chávez, the release of foreign prisoners into Britain, and Britons seeking medical treatment abroad. On the same day, he also appeared again on BBC News 24, but this time in a planned interview to talk about his experience. He later appeared in a comedy skit on The Big Fat Quiz of the Year 2006. Film producer Alison Rosenzweig stated in 2006 that she had begun developing a film based on his life, particularly this one incident, commenting "He's a fun, kind of internationally famous person that I think is an interesting source for movie material." As of September 2024, no such film has been produced. In 2022, Goma was interviewed on the BBC World Service's Outlook programme about his experience.

In 2016, ten years after Goma's appearance, the incident was named one of the BBC's most memorable interview bloopers, and some outlets noted the correctness of Goma's prediction that more people would be using the Internet to download music and other media they want.

In 2023, Goma announced on a podcast that he would be suing the BBC for royalties. In October of the same year, Goma featured in the BBC trailer for series 66 of Have I Got News For You playing the role of guest host as well as three of the four panelists.

In 2026 a book about the interview by Elliott Gotkine with Guy Goma, entitled The Wrong Guy: The Inside Story of TV's Greatest Screw-Up, was published by Simon & Schuster.
