= Guy Kewney =

British journalist (1946–2010)

- Kewney in 1996
- Born: Guy Johan Kewney; 30 April 1946; Pietermaritzburg, South Africa
- Died: 8 April 2010 (aged 63)
- Occupations: Author, journalist
- Years active: 1970s–2010
- Spouse: Mary Kewney (m. 1972)
- Children: 2

Guy Johan Kewney (30 April 1946 – 8 April 2010) was a British journalist, regarded by some as the first UK technology journalist.

== Early life ==
Kewney's original goal was to become a civil engineer, but he did not complete his university course. In 1965, he started work as a programmer for English Electric LEO Marconi, on the world's first business computer. He soon realised he was not cut out to be a programmer, so decided to switch to his other passion, writing.

== Career ==
Kewney was a personal computing pundit, starting with Personal Computer World (PCW), writing a monthly column for the magazine from its launch in 1978 until its closure in June 2009. While working for IPC Magazines at Dorset House in Stamford Street on Electronics Weekly in the late 1970s, Kewney worked with another influential UK technology journalist, Tim Palmer, who went on to found the daily newsletter Computergram International in 1984.

When PCW's circulation was at its peak, Kewney was widely regarded as one of the UK's most influential writers and broadcasters on microcomputing technology, founding and editing trade publications Microscope and PC Dealer, co-presenting Computer Trade Video and working as a TV presenter for five years on Thames TV's Database and Channel 4's 4 Computer Buffs before helping launch Ziff-Davis in Britain as the star columnist of PC Magazine (UK), PC Direct, Computer Life, IT Week, and ZDNet UK.

Kewney launched the blog NewsWireless.Net in 2002 and was a founding partner of AFAICS Research. One of his daughters, Lucy Sherriff, was on the staff of The Register until 2007.

=== BBC interview mix-up ===
On 8 May 2006, BBC News 24 journalist Karen Bowerman interviewed Congolese job applicant Guy Goma live on air, after a producer had brought him on set, mistakenly believing him to be Kewney. Goma was asked questions about the Apple Corps v. Apple Computer court case, which he struggled to answer. Kewney initially did not take the mix-up well and wrote a response on his blog, "NewsWireless", in which he commented "[a]nd the fact that a few hundred thousand people in the world are now under the impression that I'm an ignoramus who knows nothing about technology or Apple or iPods, and has a very poor command of English? – well, that's not the Beeb's problem, is it? After all, is a journalist going to sue the BBC and get blacklisted? Of course not!" However, according to a blog post by Kewney, the two had since met.

== Death ==
Kewney was diagnosed with colorectal cancer in 2009, which was found to have spread to the liver, and wrote about it in his blog, The Hunky Mousehole. He died on 8 April 2010.
