= Magic Alex =

Greek electronics engineer (1942–2017)

- Mardas in the Apple Electronics laboratory with some of the equipment he used
- Born: Yannis Alexis Mardas; 2 May 1942; Athens, Greece
- Died: 13 January 2017 (aged 74); Athens, Greece
- Other name: John Alexis Mardas
- Occupations: Electronics engineer, security consultant
- Board member of: Apple Electronics
- Spouse: Eufrosyne Doxiades

Yannis (later John) Alexis Mardas (Greek: Αλέξης Μάρδας; 2 May 1942 – 13 January 2017), also known as Magic Alex, was a Greek self-professed inventor who was closely associated with the Beatles. His nickname was given to him by John Lennon when he was involved with the group between 1965 and 1969, during which time he became head of Apple Electronics.

Mardas arrived in England in 1965, exhibiting his Kinetic Light Sculptures at the Indica Gallery. He impressed John Lennon with the Nothing Box: a small plastic box with randomly blinking lights, and allegedly claimed that he could build a 72-track tape machine. Mardas was with the Beatles at the Maharishi Mahesh Yogi's ashram in India and was then given the job of designing the new Apple Studio in Savile Row. His schemes lost Apple at least £300,000 (£4.59 million in 2025 pounds).

In the 1970s, the anti-terrorism industry offered bullet-proof vehicles, bugging devices and security hardware, so Mardas set up companies offering these products to VIPs. King Hussein of Jordan bought a fleet of cars that Mardas had customised, but then reportedly had the changes reversed when tests demonstrated them to be useless. In 1987, Mardas was a managing director of Alcom Ltd, which specialised in electronic communications and security. He later returned to Greece.

== London and the Beatles ==
The 23-year-old Yannis Alexis Mardas first arrived in England on a student visa in 1965, befriending John Dunbar of the Indica Gallery in London, and later moving in with him in a flat on Bentinck Street, which was where Mardas first met Lennon. Known at this time as Yannis Mardas, he found employment as a television repairman. Dunbar later introduced Mardas to Brian Jones, after Mardas exhibited his Kinetic Light Sculptures at the Indica Gallery. Dunbar worked with Mardas on the "psychedelic light box" for the Rolling Stones' three-week tour of Europe in 1967, although they were not impressed with the results. Dunbar later said: "He was quite cunning in the way he pitched his thing. He knew enough to know how to wind people up and to what extent. He was a fucking TV repairman: Yannis Mardas, none of this 'Magic Alex' shit!"

Jones introduced Mardas to Lennon, and it was at this point that Mardas impressed Lennon with the Nothing Box; a small plastic box with randomly blinking lights that Lennon would stare at for hours while under the influence of LSD. Lennon later introduced the renamed John Alexis Mardas as his "new guru", calling him "Magic Alex". Mardas allegedly told Lennon about ideas for futuristic electronic devices he was "working on", which he later disavowed either promising or discussing: a telephone that responded to its owner's voice and could identify who was calling, a force field that would surround the Beatles' homes, an X-ray camera, paint that would make anything invisible, car paint that would change colour by flicking a switch, and wallpaper speakers, which would actually be a part of the wallpaper. Mardas later asked for the V-12 engines from Lennon's Rolls-Royce and George Harrison's Ferrari Berlinetta car, so he could build a flying saucer. Mardas had denied these in a formal statement.

The Beatles set up a company for Mardas called Fiftyshapes Ltd. in September 1967; he later became one of the first employees of the newly formed Apple Corps, earning £40 a week (equivalent to £600 in 2025). and receiving 10% of any profits made from his inventions.

The Beatles often called Mardas the "Greek wizard", and Paul McCartney remembered being interested in his ideas: "'Well, if you [Mardas] could do that, we’d like one'. It was always, 'We'd like one'". Mardas' ideas were not confined to the realms of electronic wizardry, but included songwriting involvement, with a Lennon–Mardas composition, "What's the New Mary Jane", originally meant for inclusion on the Beatles' self-titled double album (also known as the White Album). Lennon later removed Mardas' songwriting credit for unknown reasons.

Mardas was given his own laboratory called Apple Electronics, at 34 Boston Place, Westminster, London, and was helped to obtain a British work visa. His pay eventually rose to £6,000 per year (equivalent to £91,761 in 2025), and an American patent attorney, Alfred Crotti, moved to England to assist Mardas. In a historical TV promo for Apple Corps included on the Beatles Anthology DVD, Mardas is shown wearing a white laboratory assistant's coat in Apple Electronics (with loud oscillating noises in the background) saying, "Hello, I'm Alexis, from Apple Electronics. I would like to say 'Hello' to all my brothers around the world, and to all the girls around the world, and to all the electronic people around the world. That is Apple Electronics." Mardas then turns and points back to a collection of two portable 2-track recorders in wooden boxes, a 2-track studio recording machine, voltage meters, a hi-fi amplifier, an oscilloscope, and a TV screen showing pulsating psychedelic balloon shapes. A mysterious fire at the laboratory prevented Mardas from presenting his inventions, but he later said: "I'm a rock gardener, and now I'm doing electronics. Maybe next year, I make films or poems. I have no formal training in any of these, but this is irrelevant".

=== Greece ===
The Beatles had tried in 1964 to buy the 14-acre (5.7 ha) Trinity Island, (Greek: Αγια Τριάδα), off the coast of the Greek island of Euboea (resembling a guitar in shape) but the owners were not interested in a sale. Lennon was still interested in buying or leasing an island to live on together, and discussed it with the other Beatles on 19 July 1967. Mardas' father was a major in the Greek secret police, and Mardas explained that through him the Beatles would have access to Greek government connections, which would speed the acquisition of an island, because many islands did not have the right certificates of ownership and were subject to government restrictions. On 22 July 1967, Harrison and his wife Pattie Boyd, Ringo Starr and Neil Aspinall flew to Athens, where they stayed in Mardas' parents' house overnight, until Lennon, along with Cynthia Lennon and their son Julian Lennon, McCartney and Jane Asher, Pattie Boyd's 16-year-old sister Paula, Mal Evans and Alistair Taylor set off for Athens.

Their chartered yacht, the MV Arvi, was detained in Crete because of bad weather, so the party had to wait in Athens for three days. Taylor complained that on a trip to a small hill village, "We came round a corner of the peaceful road only to find hundreds of photographers clicking away at us", which Mardas had organised. McCartney later said that while sailing around Greek islands, everybody just sat around and took LSD. They eventually found what is referred to as the 80-acre (32 ha) island of Leslo (although no Greek island is officially known by this name). The island had a small fishing village, four beaches, and a large olive grove. Four small neighbouring islands surrounded it (one for each Beatle). The Beatles sent Alistair Taylor back to London to handle the purchase of the island. Taylor received permission from the Greek government to purchase the island, and £90,000 of special "export dollars" required for the transaction were purchased. However, the Beatles changed their minds before the deal went through, and the export dollars were sold for a £11,400 profit a few months later when exchange rates went up (one of the few profitable business ventures for the Beatles).

=== Apple Boutique and marriage ===
On 1 August 1967, Mardas, Aspinall and Derek Taylor were invited by George Harrison to stay at the home of Robert Fitzpatrick on Blue Jay Way in Los Angeles, and on 7 August 1967, Harrison and his wife Pattie visited San Francisco's Haight-Ashbury district with Mardas. The Apple Boutique, at 94 Baker Street, London, was one of the first business ventures made by the Beatles' fledgling Apple Corps, and Mardas (at great expense) was commissioned to create one of his ideas: an "artificial sun" which would light up the night-time sky for the opening on 7 December 1967. When the time came for Mardas to demonstrate his artificial sun for the Beatles, he claimed that there was not a strong enough energy supply to power it; the Beatles accepted this explanation. Mardas appeared (uncredited) in the Beatles' TV movie Magical Mystery Tour, which was first broadcast on BBC1 on Boxing Day in 1967. On 11 July 1968, 26-year-old Mardas married 22-year-old Eufrosyne Doxiades (the daughter of a respected Greek architect) at St Sophia's Church, London. Harrison and his wife attended, and Lennon (who was there with Yoko Ono) was joint best man, along with Donovan.

=== Maharishi Mahesh Yogi and India ===
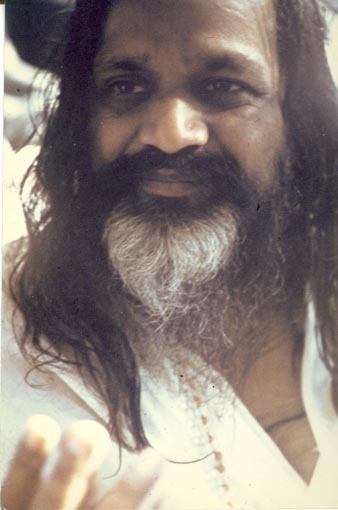
Maharishi Mahesh Yogi

Mardas and Aspinall joined Lennon and Harrison in India, where they were studying meditation under the tutelage of Maharishi Mahesh Yogi; Starr had returned to England complaining that the Indian food did not agree with him, and McCartney had left on 24 March 1968. Upon first meeting the Maharishi, Mardas said sarcastically, "I know you! Didn’t I meet you in Greece years ago?"

Mardas was jealous of the control the Maharishi had over Lennon, and during one of their frequent walks through the woods he asked Lennon why the Maharishi always had an accountant by his side. Lennon replied that the Beatles (or Lennon and Harrison) were considering donating a large part of their income to the Maharishi's bank accounts in Switzerland. When Mardas questioned the Maharishi about this, he offered money to Mardas to build a high-powered radio station, so he could broadcast Maharishi's teachings to the whole of India.

Alcohol was not allowed in the Maharishi's ashram, but Mardas smuggled some in from Dehra Dun, and later reported to Lennon and Harrison that the Maharishi had sex with a young American student, and had made a sexual advance toward Mia Farrow. This was not supported in Farrow's autobiography What Falls Away (1997), in which she wrote that she may have misinterpreted the supposed sexual advance. Mardas continued to insist the Maharishi was not what he said he was, making even Harrison unsure. Lennon mused in 1970: "Well, it must be true, because if George is doubting him, there must be something in it". Lennon and Harrison confronted the Maharishi, but the startled Maharishi's answers did not satisfy them, and they decided to leave the camp. Mardas insisted that they (Lennon, Harrison and their wives) must leave the camp at once, or the Maharishi might send down some "black magic" on them. Mardas then went down to Dehra Dun to organise taxis for the next morning to take them all to Delhi.

Cynthia Lennon personally believed that Mardas invented the story about sexual impropriety to undermine the Maharishi's influence on the Beatles, as Mardas was always jealous of anyone having Lennon's attention. Harrison and McCartney later offered their apologies to the Maharishi (McCartney said that he did not believe the accusation at all). In 2010, Mardas issued a statement to The New York Times denying that he had spread rumours.

=== Lennon's divorce ===
After returning to England in May 1968, Lennon suggested that Cynthia take a holiday in Greece with Mardas, Donovan, Boyd, and her sister. Lennon said that he would be very busy recording what would become The White Album and that it would do her some good to take a break with Mardas, his girlfriend Jenny Boyd, and others. Cynthia arrived home one day early from Greece on 22 May 1968. She and Mardas discovered Lennon and Yoko Ono sitting cross-legged on the floor, staring into each other's eyes, and found Ono's slippers outside the Lennons' marital bedroom door. Cynthia asked Boyd and Mardas if she could spend the night at their apartment. At the apartment Boyd went straight to bed, but Mardas got Cynthia drunk and tried to convince her that they should both run away together. After Cynthia had vomited in the bathroom she collapsed on a bed in the spare bedroom, but Mardas joined her and tried to kiss her until she (in her words) "pushed him away". Brian Epstein's personal assistant, Peter Brown, maintains that Cynthia did sleep with Mardas, saying: "She knew it was a mistake the moment it happened, especially with Alex [Mardas], whom she had never trusted, nor even liked".

Lennon went to New York with McCartney shortly afterward, telling Cynthia she could not go with them, so she went on a trip to Italy with her mother. During Cynthia's holiday in Italy, an "agitated" Mardas unexpectedly arrived (pacing up and down outside her hotel until she returned) and gave the news that Lennon was planning to sue Cynthia for divorce on grounds of adultery, seek sole custody of Julian, and send Cynthia "back to Hoylake". Mardas also said that he intended to testify in court that Cynthia had committed adultery with him. She said in 2005: "The mere fact that Magic Alex [Mardas] arrived in Italy in the middle of the night without any prior knowledge of where I was staying made me extremely suspicious. I was being coerced into making it easy for John [Lennon] and Yoko to accuse me of doing something that would make them not look so bad".

=== Apple Studio ===
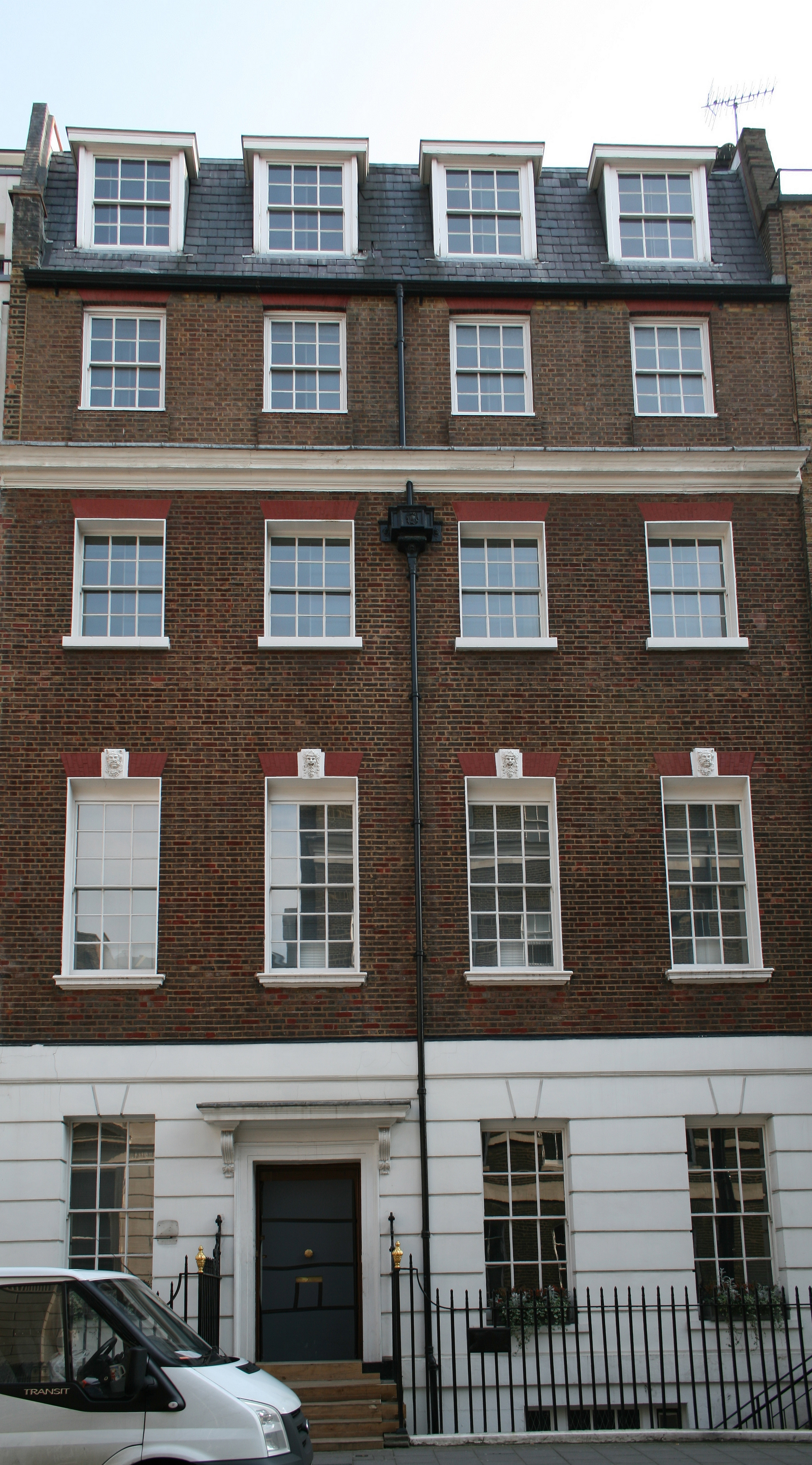
Apple Corps offices, at 3 Savile Row, where Mardas was asked to build a studio in the basement

Mardas had often said that the Abbey Road studio was "no good", much to producer George Martin's annoyance: "The trouble was that Alex was always coming to the studios to see what we were doing and to learn from it, while at the same time saying 'These people are so out of date.' But I found it very difficult to chuck him out, because the boys liked him so much. Since it was very obvious that I didn't, a minor schism developed". Mardas boasted that he could build a much better studio, with a 72-track tape machine, instead of the 4-track at Abbey Road — which was being updated at the time to an 8-track — so he was given the job of designing the new Apple Studio in the basement of Apple headquarters on Savile Row. One of Mardas' more outrageous plans was to replace the acoustic baffles around Starr's drums with an invisible sonic force field. Starr remembered that Mardas bought some "huge" surplus computers from British Aerospace, which were stored in his barn, but "they never left the barn", and were later sold as scrap metal.

Mardas gave the Beatles regular reports of his progress, but when they required their new studio in January 1969, during the Get Back project that became Let It Be, they discovered an unusable studio: no 72-track tape deck (Mardas had reduced it to 16 tracks), no soundproofing, no talkback (intercom) system, and not even a patch bay to run the wiring between the control room and the 16 speakers that Mardas had fixed haphazardly to the walls. The only new piece of sound equipment present was a crude mixing console which Mardas had built, which looked (in the words of Martin's assistant, Dave Harries) like "bits of wood and an old oscilloscope". The console was scrapped after just one session. Harrison said it was "chaos", and that they had to "rip it all out and start again," calling it "the biggest disaster of all time." Harrison's suspicions of Mardas' competence had been raised when he saw him wandering around in a white coat with a clipboard, and considered the possibility that Mardas had "just read the latest version of Science Weekly, and used its ideas". Mardas later stated that he had never been in the basement of Savile Row, as the studio equipment he was building was being tested in Apple Electronics, at Boston Place, Marylebone. The Beatles asked producer Martin to come to the rescue, so he borrowed two portable four-track recorders from EMI, and long-time Beatles' engineer Geoff Emerick was given the task of building and setting up a recording studio with the loaned equipment.

During these sessions, Mardas gave the Beatles a prototype of a combination rhythm guitar and bass that had a swivel neck. In the film The Beatles: Get Back, Lennon wondered how he would play guitar with the strings of the bass against his hand, and noted that it was impossible to tune.

After Allen Klein was brought in to be the Beatles' manager in 1969, he closed Apple Electronics and Mardas left the company. It was later estimated that Mardas' ideas and projects had cost the Beatles at least £300,000 (£4.59 million in 2025 pounds if it was essentially spent in 1968). Starr once approved of one of Mardas' ideas: "He [Mardas] had an idea to stop people taping our records off the radio – you'd have to have a decoder to get the signal, and then we thought we could sell the time and put commercials on instead. We brought EMI and Capitol in from America to look at it, but they weren't interested at all."

According to author Peter Doggett, in the Beatles' history, Mardas is the only individual who occupies a place close to Klein's in terms of vilification from commentators and biographers.

== Security consultant ==
In the 1970s, the anti-terrorism industry offered bullet-proof vehicles, bugging devices and security hardware. Mardas set up companies offering these products to VIPs, using the former King Constantine II of Greece as his principal salesman. Ex-King Constantine — who at the time was exiled in Britain — provided contacts to several royal families for Mardas, and had close contact with the deposed Shah of Iran, who had moved to Mexico. The Shah was one of the first people interested in the customised bullet-proof cars that Mardas was offering, and was believed to have financially assisted Mardas’ companies.

In 1974, Mardas held an expensive party for the then-heir to the throne of Spain Prince Juan Carlos; this secured Mardas a contract. After the assassination of Luis Carrero Blanco the Spanish royal family thought it ought to acquire more bullet-proof cars, although one car was shipped to England, where it was parked in Chobham for almost a year as nobody knew how to do the work needed to upgrade it. The second contract (worth over £1/2 million) allowed Mardas to set up new security companies: Alcom Devices Ltd, and Night Vision Systems Ltd (under the collective name of "Project Alcom") in St Albans Mews off Edgware Road, London, to provide a sophisticated communications system for Juan Carlos, so he could be in constant contact with his security services. Mardas employed Arthur Johnson (known as Johnny Johnson), a former Ministry of Defence official.

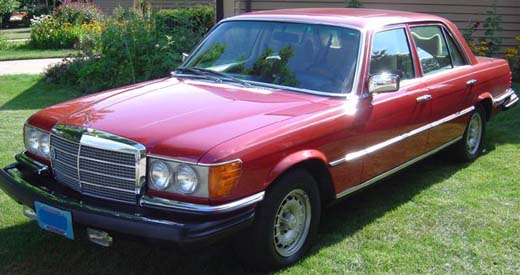
North American–spec Mercedes-Benz 1978 450SEL 6.9

The Sultan of Oman ordered six Mercedes 450 limousines in 1977, but quickly discovered that they were not as safe as he had been led to believe. His ex-SAS bodyguards tested one of the cars in the desert in July 1977, by firing guns at it, but a bullet hit an emergency air cylinder, which caused the fuel tank to explode, destroying the entire car. The remaining cars were immediately sent back, with a demand to refund the money spent. King Hussein of Jordan had a fleet of cars that Mardas customised, but carried out a safety test on them with live ammunition in November 1977. One eyewitness reported that the cars could be more life-threatening than ordinary vehicles, as bullets easily pierced the armour-plating, and the thick armoured glass broke into jagged splinters when struck. Hussein ordered that the cars be restored to their previous state. These failures convinced Mardas and Constantine to look at the growing European market for anti-terrorist protection, setting up a factory in London to produce "bullet-proof" cars in 1978. This was financed by an investment of over £1 million through anonymous Monegasque and Swiss bank accounts, which were believed to be controlled by the Shah.

== The media and the courts ==
On 28 February 1988, The Observer published an article naming Mardas as an arms dealer, but printed an apology on 30 April 1989. After an article on 18 September 1988 ("Joan's Secret Lover"), and another a week later, The People newspaper was taken to court by Mardas, who won £75,000 in damages. The Daily Mail published an apology and gave an undisclosed sum in damages on 16 January 2004, after an article on 11 June 2003, which accused Mardas of dealings that would later resurface in his claim against The New York Times in 2008.

The Independent newspaper apologised on 21 August 2006, writing that on 14 June 2006, the paper had wrongly reported Mardas' involvement with Apple Electronics Ltd. They corrected the earlier piece by writing that Mardas had not been a company employee, but a director and shareholder of Apple Electronics, and had not been fired, but resigned his directorship in May 1971, while still retaining his shareholding, until giving it to Apple Corps some years later. The paper accepted that Mardas "did not claim to have invented electric paint, a flying saucer or a recording studio with a 'sonic force field' or cause his employers to waste money on such ideas. We apologise to Mr. Mardas for these errors".

In 2008, Mardas won the right to sue The New York Times in England, in relation to an online article which said he was a charlatan. In a story about the Maharishi, Allan Kozinn had written: "Alexis Mardas, a supposed inventor and charlatan who had become a Beatles' insider". After an appeal, Mardas won the right to continue his case of defamation against The New York Times in 2009. After The New York Times produced a witness, Sir Harold Evans, who gave evidence supporting the journalistic responsibility of the paper, Mardas said he would not pursue the case further, on condition that the paper would publicly explain that by labelling him as a charlatan, it did not mean to imply that he was a con man. On 4 March 2010, The New York Times published an editor's update to the 2008 article, saying: "While expressing skepticism about his work as an inventor during that period, the article did not accuse Mr. Mardas of engaging in fraudulent dealings or criminality. ... The Times's reporting on those events was attributed to Paul McCartney and based on widely published accounts from books and magazines".

== Later years and death ==
Mardas put 15 items from his collection of Lennon memorabilia up for sale on 5 May 2004 at Christie's in South Kensington, London. Among the sale was Lennon's leather collar worn during 1967 and 1968 (at the launch party for the Sgt. Pepper's Lonely Hearts Club Band LP, and on the cover of Lennon and Ono's Unfinished Music No.1: Two Virgins), as well as a custom Vox Kensington guitar, a coloured felt pen drawing called "Strong", and a pen and ink drawing by Lennon entitled "Happy Fish". Mardas said he planned to donate the money to a charity in Greece. The "custom Vox Kensington guitar" later sold at an auction for £269,000 on 19 May 2013. Mardas lived in Athens until his death on 13 January 2017 at age 74 from pneumonia.
