= Rupert Goodwins =

British writer, broadcaster and journalist (born 1965)

- Born: 23 May 1965 (age 61)
- Occupations: Writer, broadcaster and technology journalist

Rupert Goodwins (born 23 May 1965) is a British writer, broadcaster and technology journalist.

He began his career as a programmer for Sinclair Research in the early 1980s, working on the ZX Spectrum ROM. He moved to Amstrad after it bought the rights to the Sinclair name and range of products.

Goodwins was the technical editor of IT Week magazine and has written for a number of other UK computer publications, including:

- MacUser UK
- Nature
- PC Magazine
- Personal Computer World
- Sinclair User
- The Daily Telegraph

Goodwins also wrote the 64-page novella accompanying the game Weird Dreams by Rainbird.

He was editor of ZDNET UK. His most notable contribution to the site was Rupert's Diary, which preceded the blogging phenomenon by some years. He occasionally appeared on CNet UK's technology podcast, Crave, and the Dialogue Box video series.

In addition to journalism, he also writes short stories, often with a technological theme to them. He is a regular contributor to radio and television news and current affairs programmes on business and technology issues.

Goodwins is also a keen amateur radio operator with the call sign G6HVY.

== Bibliography ==
=== Online archived short stories ===
- "The Cold Winds of Heaven," in Quanta (1991), edited by Daniel K. Appelquist

=== Essays and reporting ===
- Goodwins, Rupert (January 2014). "Home in a day : an open-source construction system could upend architecture as we know it". Popular Science (Australian Ed.). 62: 66–69.

=== Novels ===
- "Stones in the Sky," (2011)
