= Sosumi =

Macintosh alert sound

Sosumi /ˌsoʊˈsjuːˈmi/ is an alert sound introduced by Apple sound designer Jim Reekes in Apple Computer's Macintosh System 7 operating system in 1991. The name is derived from the phrase "so sue me" because of a long running court battle with Apple Corps, the similarly named music company affiliated with the Beatles, regarding the use of music in Apple Inc.'s computer products.

== History ==
The "Sosumi" alert sound, created by Jim Reekes.

Sosumi is a short alert sound created at Apple Computer in 1989 for the System 7 operating system. The new OS introduced custom system beeps, prompting an Apple engineer to create a sound initially called "Xylophone", described as a "staccato E-flat diminished triad". However, this short beep presented a potential legal problem. During the development of System 7, Apple Computer had reached a settlement with the Beatles' record label, Apple Corps, following an earlier dispute over the inclusion of a sound synthesis chip in the Apple IIGS computer. Under this agreement, Apple Computer was prohibited from using its trademark on "creative works whose principal content is music".

All new System 7 sounds were reviewed by Apple's Legal Department. Lawyers objected that the new beep, which had since been renamed to "chime", was "too musical" under the terms of the 1991 settlement. Jim Reekes, the engineer managing new sounds for the OS, grew frustrated with the intense legal scrutiny. He joked that the sound should be named "Let It Beep", a pun on the Beatles' song "Let It Be". When a colleague pointed out that Legal would never approve it, Reekes quipped, "so sue me". After a brief reflection, he resubmitted the sound as sosumi (a homophone for "so sue me"). Careful to submit it in writing to obscure its pronunciation, Reekes falsely informed the Legal Department that the word was Japanese and had nothing to do with music.

The sound and its defiant, punning name quickly gained notoriety in computer folklore as a humorous chapter in the long-running Apple Corps v Apple Computer trademark conflict.

Sosumi remained a staple in subsequent Apple operating systems for decades. However, the original chime was finally replaced with a new audio sample in the 2020 release of macOS Big Sur. While the new sound was initially labeled "Sosumi" in early public betas, it was eventually renamed to Sonumi in the System Preferences menu. Despite the UI change, the underlying sound file in /System/Library/Sounds/ remains named Sosumi.aiff. This matches Apple's approach to other updated alert sounds in Big Sur (such as "Breeze" and "Crystal"), which also retained their legacy macOS file names (Blow.aiff and Glass.aiff, respectively).

== In popular culture ==
The term is in the poem "A Short Address to the Academy of Silence" by Jay Parini.

Apple uses the CSS class name "sosumi" for formatting legal fine print on Apple product web pages.

The 2002 Disney animated action-adventure film Treasure Planet, Jim Hawkins sees the skeleton of Captain Flint, holding B.E.N.'s missing memory chip in its hand, then he re-inserts the part into B.E.N.'s memory chip, making the Macintosh's Sosumi sound effect, and the planet starts collapsing.

In 2006, Geek Squad used this sound in their commercial "Jet Pack", in which a woman was frustrated over her computer.

== See also ==
- Apple libel dispute with Carl Sagan for a similar revenge-by-pun anecdote
