= Andrew Orlowski =

British journalist (born 1966)

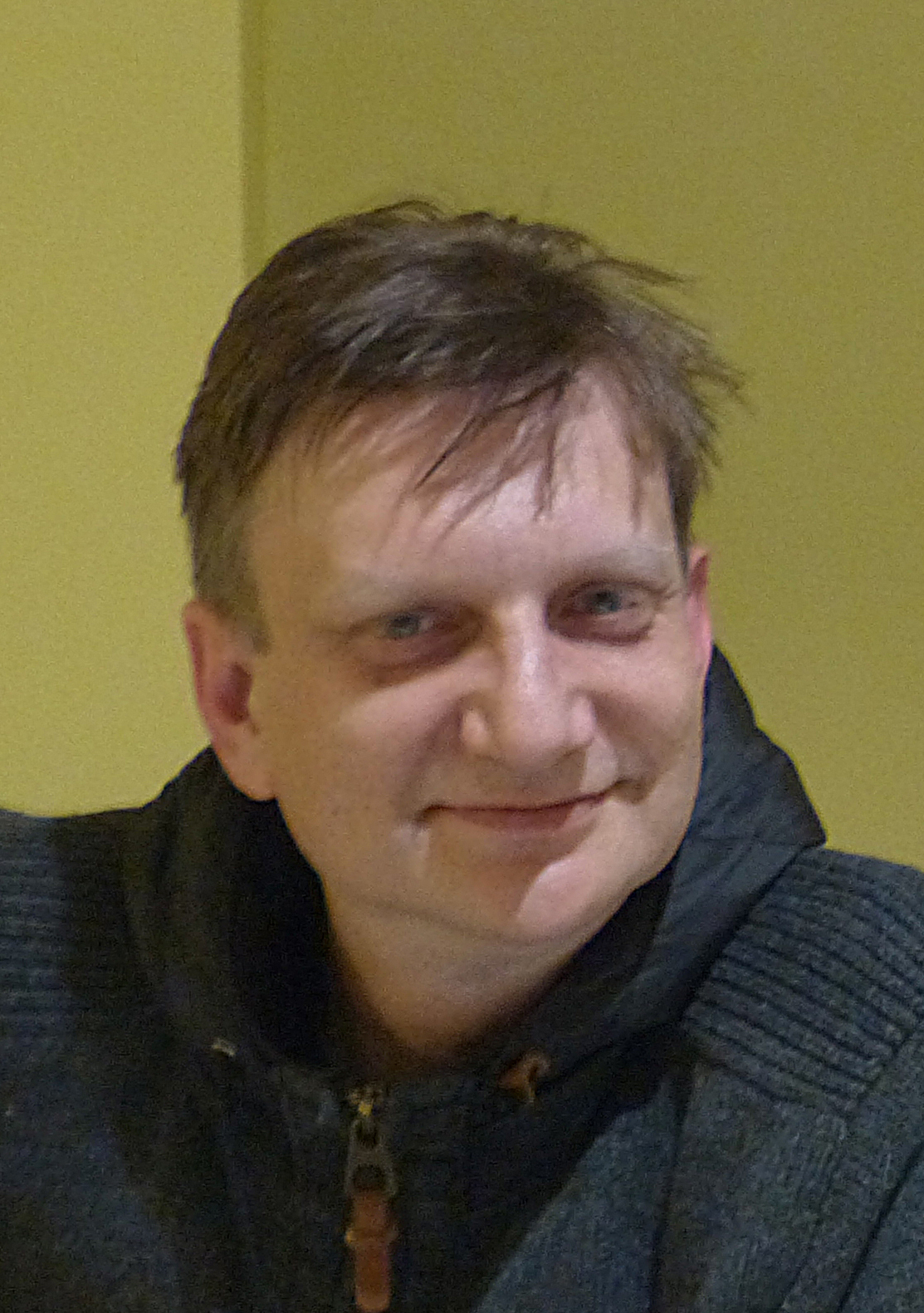
- Orlowski in 2014
- Born: 1966 (age 59–60)
- Occupations: Former executive editor for IT news and opinion website The Register
- Website: andreworlowski.com

Andrew Orlowski (born 1966) is a British columnist, investigative journalist and former executive editor of the IT news and opinion website The Register. In 2021, Orlowski became a business columnist for The Daily Telegraph.

== Journalism career ==
In his youth, Orlowski had been involved in a school magazine called Within These Walls, and a fanzine named Paradise Demise. Moving from Northallerton, Yorkshire, to Manchester in 1984, he studied at University of Manchester and worked as a receptionist in the IT department at GM Buses, before taking a course in computer programming. He worked as a programmer in Altrincham in the early 1990s, and later said that he "found that a lot less creative than I'd expected, and this being my first proper job I soon got disillusioned."

Orlowski wrote reviews for Manchester's City Life magazine from 1988, and with the encouragement of Sarah Champion started an alternative newspaper called Badpress in Manchester in 1992 that published investigative news stories. In 1994, having moved to London, he became computer correspondent for Private Eye magazine. In the mid to late 1990s, he wrote for PC Pro, The New Statesman and The Independent and was news editor at IT Week. Orlowski subsequently worked as a columnist and executive editor at IT news and opinion website The Register for 19 years, leaving in May 2019; he was based in San Francisco for seven years in the early 2000s.

Orlowski began writing for The Daily Telegraph in September 2019, becoming a regular columnist on business matters in March 2021.

=== "Googlewashing" ===
In 2003, Orlowski coined the term googlewashing to describe the potential for accidental or intentional censorship of concepts through the way search engines like Google Search operate. An article in The New York Times commenting on worldwide anti-war demonstrations had stated that "there may still be two superpowers on the planet: the United States and world public opinion", and suddenly the term "the Second Superpower" acquired widespread currency. However, within a few weeks, most of the top search engine results for the term had come to be about something else, because a prominent blogger had used the same term in what Orlowski described as a "plea for net users to organize themselves as a 'superpower'." The blogger's piece was so well linked and so widely commented upon online that the first few pages of Google hits in a search for "the second superpower" all were about his new meaning, with the original anti-war meaning relegated to "other links not shown because they are deemed to be irrelevant." Even the term googlewashing itself almost came to be "googlewashed" in a similar manner, with Orlowski's original definition temporarily disappearing from the top Google search results for the term.

=== Writings on techno-utopianism ===
Orlowski is a frequent writer on techno-utopianism. Concerning the political influence of Google, Orlowski has said: "The web is a secular religion at the moment and politicians go to pray at events like the Google Zeitgeist conference. Any politician who wants to brand himself as a forward-looking person will get himself photographed with the Google boys. [...] It's the big regulatory issue of the next 10 years: how politicians deal with Google. If the web is as important as the politicians say, it seems odd that one company sets the price and defines the terms of business."

Commenting on the vision of the technological singularity, a future time when people and machines would combine to form a new superintelligence, and at least a part of humanity might overcome biological limitations like death and disease, he has stated that "The Singularity is not the great vision for society that Lenin had or Milton Friedman might have. It is rich people building a lifeboat and getting off the ship."

In December 2004, Orlowski was invited to a discussion panel on techno-utopianism at Harvard Law School's Berkman Center for Internet and Society. He was Assistant Producer of Adam Curtis' 2011 BBC TV series on techno-utopianism, All Watched Over By Machines of Loving Grace.

=== Criticism of English Wikipedia ===
Since the 2000s, Orlowski has criticized the English Wikipedia. In 2004, he approvingly quoted a Register reader who had called Wikipedia enthusiasts "the Khmer Rouge in diapers". Writing about Wikipedia in 2005, he observed: "Readability, which wasn't great to begin with, has plummeted. Formerly coherent and reasonably accurate articles in the technical section have gotten worse as they've gotten longer." In a 2005 BBC article, Bill Thompson said Orlowski was "scathing in his dismissal of the site as a cult-like organisation where faith triumphs rationality, and even suggests we look at English Wikipedia as 'a massively scalable, online role-playing game' where 'players can assume fictional online identities and many "editors" do just that'." As a columnist for The Daily Telegraph, Orlowski has criticised Wikimedia Foundation fundraising, arguing that the organisation has far more money than its appeals make people believe.
