= Computing (magazine) =

Weekly trade magazine published in the UK

- Editor: Stuart Sumner
- Categories: Computer magazine
- Frequency: Fortnightly
- Founded: 1973
- Company: The Channel Company
- Country: United Kingdom
- Based in: London
- Language: English
- Website: www.computing.co.uk
- ISSN: 1361-2972

Computing is an online magazine published by The Channel Company for IT managers and professionals in the United Kingdom. The brand announced plans to launch in North America and Germany in 2023.

As of December 2006, Computing's circulation was verified by BPA Worldwide as 115,431.

== History ==
Originally launched in 1973 as the official magazine of the British Computer Society and published by Haymarket Publishing, Computing is the longest continuously published magazine for IT professionals in the UK.

In print it was largely a controlled circulation publication, mailed without charge to members of the British Computer Society and other accredited workers in the field of computing. A small minority of issues were sold on newsstands, with the bulk of funding for production arising from advertising.

It was one of two magazines (the other being Accountancy Age) purchased in the 1970s by Dutch publisher VNU Business Media to launch their business in the UK. VNU Business Publications was acquired by Incisive Media in 2007. In April 2022, The Channel Company acquired CRN UK, Computing, and Channel Partner Insight from Incisive Media.

Along with Computer Weekly (and formerly IT Week), Computing is the mainstay of the UK computer industry trade press. Historically, Computing was aimed at business-focused readers, with Computer Weekly catering for readers seeking more technical coverage. This distinction blurred and dissolved in the late 1980s, with IT Week filling the gap left in technology-focused business coverage from 1998. In recent years Computing has pursued both a technical- and business-oriented agenda.

The Computing web site was relaunched with new video and audio content and a focus on extensive reader interactivity in early 2007. About a dozen regular bloggers were introduced to create dynamic content for the online version of the magazine, some of these blogs also being carried in the print title.

The print edition of Computing changed from a weekly to bi-weekly magazine from 10th June 2010. The print edition of the magazine ended publication in the mid-2010s.

The long-term editor of Computing, Bryan Glick, left the title in November 2009 to pursue a new role as editor-in-chief of Computer Weekly. He was replaced in January 2010 by Abigail Warakar, who resigned in January 2012; Chris Middleton, a former editor of Computer Business Review (and deputy editor of Computing in 2001) returned as interim editor. Stuart Sumner became editor of Computing in July 2012. Tom Allen, former deputy editor of Display Daily and who had been with Computing since 2017, took over as editor in October 2022.

Computing is available online.
