= Apple Corps v Apple Computer =

1978–2006 trademark dispute

Between 1978 and 2007, there were a number of legal disputes between Apple Corps (owned by the Beatles) and the computer manufacturer Apple Computer (now Apple Inc.) over competing trademark rights, specifically over the use of the name "Apple" and their respective logos which consist of a profile of an apple. Apple Inc. paid Apple Corps. over three settlements: $80,000 in 1978, $26.5 million in 1991, and $500 million in 2007, when Apple Inc. acquired all the trademarks related to "Apple".

The disputes provided a notable example of the "A moron in a hurry" legal test. They also led to the Guy Goma incident and inspired the Sosumi alert sound.

== History of trademark disputes ==
=== 1978–1981 ===
In 1978, Apple Corps, the Beatles-founded holding company and owner of their record label, Apple Records, filed a lawsuit against Apple Computer for trademark infringement. The suit was settled in 1981 for the then-undisclosed amount of US$80,000 (equivalent to $283,300 in 2025) being paid to Apple Corps. As a condition of the settlement, Apple Computer agreed not to enter the music business, and Apple Corps agreed not to enter the computer business.

=== 1986–1991 ===
In 1986, Apple Computer added MIDI and audio-recording capabilities to its computers, which included putting the advanced Ensoniq 5503 DOC sound chip from synthesizer maker Ensoniq into the Apple IIGS computer. In 1989, this led Apple Corps to sue again, claiming violation of the 1981 settlement agreement.

In 1991, a settlement involving payment of around US$26.5 million (equivalent to $62.6 million in 2025) to Apple Corps was reached. Outlined in the settlement was each company's respective trademark rights to the term "Apple". Apple Corps held the right to use Apple on any "creative works whose principal content is music", while Apple Computer held the right to use Apple on "goods or services ... used to reproduce, run, play or otherwise deliver such content", but not on content distributed on physical media. In other words, Apple Computer agreed that it would not package, sell or distribute physical music materials.

==== Sosumi ====
In 1989, when the lawsuit was filed, Apple Computer employee Jim Reekes was part of the team working on the company's operating system update, System 7. He had added a sampled system sound called Chimes — a name which the company legal department worried was "too musical" and would further exacerbate the legal challenge. Reekes successfully resubmitted the name as sosumi, not pointing out to the company lawyers that this would be read phonetically as "so sue me". By coincidence, Mac OS 7 was released to the public in 1991, the same year the settlement of the lawsuit was reached.

=== 2003–2006 ===
In September 2003, Apple Corps sued Apple Computer again, this time for breach of contract, in using the Apple logo in the creation and operation of Apple Computer's iTunes Music Store, which Apple Corps contended was a violation of the previous agreement. Some observers believed the wording of the previous settlement favoured Apple Computer in this case. Other observers speculated that if Apple Corps was successful, Apple Computer would be forced to offer a much larger settlement, perhaps resulting in Apple Corps becoming a major shareholder in Apple Computer, or perhaps in Apple Computer splitting the iPod and related business into a separate entity.

Following Apple Computer's unsuccessful efforts, in 2003 and 2004, to have the lawsuit dismissed by a California court, or have the jurisdiction changed to California by an English court, the trial opened on 29 March 2006 in England, before a single judge of the High Court. In opening arguments, a lawyer for Apple Corps stated that in 2003, shortly before the launch of Apple Computer's on-line music store, Apple Corps rejected a $1 million offer from Apple Computer to use the Apple name on the iTunes store.

On 8 May 2006 the court ruled in favour of Apple Computer, with Mr Justice Mann holding that "no breach of the trademark agreement [had] been demonstrated".

The Judge focused on section 4.3 of that agreement:

4.3 The parties acknowledge that certain goods and services within the Apple Computer Field of Use are capable of delivering content within the Apple Corps Field of Use. In such case, even though Apple Corps shall have the exclusive right to use or authorize others to use the Apple Corps Marks on or in connection with content within subsection 1.3(i) or (ii) [the Apple Corps catalogue and any future music], Apple Computers [sic] shall have the exclusive right to use or authorize others to use the Apple Computer Marks on or in connection with goods or services within subsection 1.2 [Apple Computer Field of Use] (such as software, hardware or broadcasting services) used to reproduce, run, play or otherwise deliver such content provided it shall not use or authorize others to use the Apple Computer Marks on or in connection with physical media delivering pre-recorded content within subsection 1.3(i) or (ii) (such as a compact disc of the Rolling Stones music).

The Judge held Apple Computer's use was covered under this clause.

In response, Neil Aspinall, manager of Apple Corps, indicated that the company did not accept the decision: "With great respect to the trial judge, we consider he has reached the wrong conclusion. [...] We will accordingly be filing an appeal and putting the case again to the Court of Appeal." The judgment orders Apple Corps to pay Apple Computer's legal costs at an estimated GB£2 million, but pending the appeal the judge declined Apple Computer's request for an interim payment of £1.5 million.

The verdict coincidentally led to the Guy Goma incident on BBC News 24, in which a job applicant mistakenly appeared on air after he was confused with computing expert Guy Kewney.

=== 2007 ===
There was a hint that relations between the companies were improving at the January 2007 Macworld conference, when Apple Inc. CEO Steve Jobs featured Beatles content heavily in his keynote presentation and demonstration of the iPhone. During that year's All Things Digital conference, Jobs quoted the Beatles song "Two of Us" in reference to his relationship with co-panelist Microsoft chairman Bill Gates. Speculation abounded regarding the much anticipated arrival of the Beatles' music to the iTunes Store.

As revealed on 5 February 2007, Apple Inc. and Apple Corps reached a settlement of their trademark dispute under which Apple Inc. will own all of the trademarks related to "Apple" and will license certain of those trademarks back to Apple Corps for their continued use. The settlement ends the ongoing trademark lawsuit between the companies, with each party bearing its own legal costs, and Apple Inc. will continue using its name and logos on iTunes. The settlement includes terms that are confidential, although newspaper accounts at the time stated that Apple Computer was buying out Apple Corps' trademark rights for a total of $500 million.

Commenting on the settlement, Apple Inc. CEO Steve Jobs said, "We love the Beatles, and it has been painful being at odds with them over these trademarks. It feels great to resolve this in a positive manner, and in a way that should remove the potential of further disagreements in the future."

Commenting on the settlement on behalf of the shareholders of Apple Corps, Neil Aspinall, manager of Apple Corps said, "It is great to put this dispute behind us and move on. The years ahead are going to be very exciting times for us. We wish Apple Inc. every success and look forward to many years of peaceful co-operation with them."

Reports in April 2007 that Apple Corps had settled another long-running dispute with EMI (and that Neil Aspinall had retired and been replaced by Jeff Jones) further fueled media speculation that the Beatles' catalogue would appear on iTunes.

Ahead of the June 2007 release of Paul McCartney's solo album, Memory Almost Full, Apple aired an ad for his single "Dance Tonight", promoting their iPods. Later in September that same year, an Apple press release for the new iPod touch, related iPod updates, and iPhone price cut was titled "The Beat Goes On", the title of the Beatles' last press release before splitting up. Although Beatles content was still unavailable from the iTunes store, each Beatle's solo work could be accessed and downloaded on this service. McCartney was quoted in Rolling Stone as saying that their catalogue would be released through digital music stores such as iTunes in the first quarter of 2008, but this did not happen until 2010.

== See also ==
- Apple Inc. litigation
- A moron in a hurry, a legal test referenced by Apple's lawyers
- Confusing similarity, a test in trademark law
- Apple Records, a company which changed their name after Apple Corps threatened to sue them for copying Apple Records' name.

== Bibliography ==
- Doggett, Peter (2011). You Never Give Me Your Money. Harper. ISBN 978-0-06-177418-8.
- Soocher, Stan (1999). They Fought the Law: Rock Music Goes to Court. Schirmer Trade Books. ISBN 0-8256-7241-4.
- Southall, Brian (2009). Pop Goes to Court: Rock 'n' Pop's Greatest Court Battles. Omnibus Press. ISBN 978-1-84772-113-6.
