= Elliott Gotkine =

British journalist

Elliott Gotkine is an Emmy Award-winning British journalist, master of ceremonies and public speaking coach. He works as a freelance correspondent for CNN. He was previously Bloomberg Television's Middle East Editor and the BBC's South America Correspondent, based in Buenos Aires.

== Background ==
Elliott Gotkine was born on 25 December 1975 in London, England. He studied Geography at the University of Nottingham and graduated in 1998.

== Career ==
In November 1998, Gotkine became a production runner for the London News Network. From April to August 1999 he became a reporter for Euromoney's International Financial Law Review. Following this he was Deputy Stock Market Editor for the now-defunct UK-iNvest.com until December 2000.

Gotkine first joined the BBC in January 2001 as a broadcast journalist with BBC Business. He was a video journalist for the BBC's World Business Report programme from May to August 2002. He was the BBC's Lima Correspondent from September 2002 to August 2003. It was during this time that he interviewed Peru's Mario Vargas Llosa for the BBC. During this time he also filed for The Observer, The Jerusalem Report, People magazine and National Public Radio.

In September 2003, Gotkine was posted to Buenos Aires, as the BBC's South America Correspondent. He covered stories including Maradona's brush with death in 2004, anti-government protests in Bolivia and the plight of the internally displaced in Colombia. He has interviewed former Venezuelan President Hugo Chavez, Evo Morales of Bolivia, and the former Presidents of Ecuador and Peru, Lucio Gutierrez and Alejandro Toledo.

In January 2007, Gotkine joined Bloomberg Television as a business reporter, before being promoted to the role of Europe Business Editor.

In February 2013, Gotkine move to Tel Aviv to take up the newly created role of Middle-East editor. Since 2018, he has been working as a freelance correspondent for CNN. In 2024, he was part of the CNN team that won an Emmy for breaking news coverage of the October 7 terrorist attacks, as well as the team that won the Overseas Press Club David Kaplan Award for its coverage of the Israel-Hamas war.

In 2026 a book by Gotkine (with Guy Goma) about the Guy Goma BBC interview, entitled The Wrong Guy: The Inside Story of TV's Greatest Screw-Up, was published by Simon & Schuster.
