= Euphrosyne Doxiadis =

Greek artist and writer

Euphrosyne Doxiadis (born 19 April 1946) is a Greek artist, art historian, and writer. In 2025, she authored NG6461: The Fake Rubens and outlined her belief that Sir Peter Paul Rubens' Samson and Delilah (1609–1610) is an art forgery.

== Early life and education ==
Doxiadis was born in Athens and studied art in Salzburg, at the Cranbrook Academy of Art in Michigan, and at the Slade School of Fine Art and the Wimbledon School of Art in London.

== Career ==
She teaches at the Aegean Center for the Fine Arts.

== Personal ==
She lives and works in Athens and Paris.

== Publications ==
- Doxiadis, Euphrosyne (2025). NG6461: The Fake Rubens (Columbia University Press).
- Doxiadis, Euphrosyne (1995). The Mysterious Fayum Portraits: Faces from Ancient Egypt. The book received widespread critical acclaim.
