= Personal Computer World =

1978–2009 British computer magazine

- Personal Computer World' 'new look' issue from November 2005
- Frequency: Monthly
- First issue: February 1978
- Final issue: June 2009
- Country: United Kingdom
- Based in: London
- ISSN: 0142-0232

Personal Computer World (PCW) (February 1978 – June 2009) was the first British computer magazine. Although for at least the last decade it contained a high proportion of Windows PC content (reflecting the state of the IT field), the magazine's title was not intended as a specific reference to this. At its inception in 1978 'personal computer' was still a generic term (the Apple II, PET 2001 and TRS-80 had been launched as personal computers in 1977). The magazine began before the Wintel (or IBM PC compatible) platform existed; the original IBM PC itself was introduced in 1981. Similarly, the magazine was unrelated to the Amstrad PCW.

== History ==
PCW was founded by the Croatian-born Angelo Zgorelec in 1978, and was the first microcomputer magazine in Britain. PCW's first cover model, in February 1978, was the Nascom-1, which also partly inspired Zgorelec to launch the magazine. Its August 1978 issue featured the colour capabilities of the Apple II.

PCW went monthly from the second edition. Zgorelec went into partnership with Felix Dennis who published his first issue in September 1979. before selling the title to VNU in 1982. The magazine was later owned by Incisive Media, which announced its closure on 8 June 2009.

As the magazine was launched four years before the first IBM PC (reviewed in the magazine in November 1981) the magazine originally covered early self-build microcomputers. It later expanded its coverage to all kinds of microcomputers from home computers to workstations, as the industry evolved. Regular features in the earlier years of the magazine were Guy Kewney's Newsprint section, Benchtests (in-depth computer reviews), Subset, covering machine code programming, type-in program listings, Bibliofile (book reviews), the Computer Answers help column, Checkouts (brief hardware reviews) TJ's Workshop (for terminal junkies), Screenplay for game reviews and Banks' Statement, the regular column from Martin Banks. In 1983 Jerry Sanders joined the staff as Features Editor and wrote the first published review of Microsoft Word 1.0 for the magazine.

The cover style, with a single photo or illustration dominating the page, was adopted soon after its launch and continued until the early 1990s. The cover photos were often humorous, such as showing each new computer made by Sinclair being used by chimpanzees, a tradition that started with the ZX81.

Personal Computer World April 1987 issue

PCW eagerly promoted new computers as they appeared, including the BBC Micro. The magazine also sponsored the Personal Computer World Show, an annual consumer and trade fair held in London every September from 1978 to 1989.

The magazine underwent a major reader marketing push in 1992, resulting in its circulation figure rising from a middle-ranking 80,000 to more than 155,000 at a time when personal computing was becoming hugely popular thanks to Windows 3.1 and IBM PC clones flooding the market. PCW battled with rivals Computer Shopper, PC Direct, PC Magazine and PC Pro for several thousand pages of advertising each month, resulting in magazines that could run to over 700 pages.

The magazine typically came with a cover-mounted CD-ROM or DVD-ROM, which held additional content. Although the magazines themselves were identical, the DVD version cost more than the CD-ROM version.

During a brief period in 2001, the magazine was (effectively) sold as 'PCW' as part of a major overhaul of the magazine design and content, but this abbreviation was dropped from the cover after just a few issues. The content also reverted from having been a bit more consumer electronics focused to return to its roots.

The magazine changed (both in terms of style and content) on many occasions after its launch. The last major change took place with the November 2005 issue, when the magazine was relaunched with an updated look (including glossier paper and a redesigned layout), new features, fewer advertising pages, and a slightly higher price tag.

Editors of the 1990s include Guy Swarbrick, Ben Tisdall, Simon Rockman, Gordon Laing and Riyad Emeran. At the time of its closure, the editor was Kelvyn Taylor.

== Closure ==
The magazine was closed in June 2009, with owners Incisive Media quoting poor sales and a difficult economic climate for newsstand titles. At the time of closing, it was the second most popular monthly technology title in the UK, with an audited circulation figure of 54,069 Its last issue, dated August 2009, was published on 8 June 2009. This final issue made no mention of its being the last one, and advertised a never to be published September issue. Subscribers were offered the option of a refund, or transferring their subscriptions to PCW's sister magazine, Computeractive.

At its close PCW featured a mixture of articles, mainly related to the Windows PC, with some Linux and Macintosh-related content. The news pages included reports on various new technologies. Other parts of the magazine contained reviews of computers and software. There was also a 'Hands On' section which was more tutorial-based. Advertising still made up a proportion of its bulk, although it had diminished somewhat since its peak in the 1990s.
