= Weird Dreams =

1989 video game

- Developer: Rainbird Software
- Publisher: Rainbird Software
- Designers: Herman Serrano; James Hutchby; Tony King
- Composers: Barry Leitch (MS-DOS, C64); David Whittaker (Amiga, ST)
- Platforms: Amiga, Atari ST, Commodore 64, MS-DOS
- Release: April 1989: Atari ST; May 1989: Amiga; Fall 1989: MS-DOS; 1990: C64
- Genre: Platform
- Mode: Single-player

Weird Dreams is a cinematic platform game developed by Rainbird Software which was published for the Amiga, Atari ST, Commodore 64, and MS-DOS. A modified version served as the visual component to a phone-in quiz on ITV's Motormouth. Versions for the Amstrad CPC and ZX Spectrum were cancelled.

== Plot ==
The background story is told by a 64-page novella with 19 chapters written by Rupert Goodwins.

Steve is in love with his attractive coworker Emily. Unbeknownst to Steve, Emily is possessed by a daemon named Zelloripus who was banished to Earth, stripped of most of her powers, and trapped in a human female due to unspecified crimes done to other daemons. Emily sees a chance to let someone else suffer and stifle her boredom. She tricks Steve into taking three pills she has mixed to "cure his flu". While the pills do cure him, they also grant Zelloripus access to his body and mind. His dreams become both more lucid and strange, each one getting more intense and painful. Steve's psychiatrist does not understand what causes the dreams, and neither does Steve. He refers him to a neurosurgeon. After his health dramatically declines, Steve undertakes brain surgery in an attempt to stop the dreams. Under an anaesthetic, he slips into one more dream, possibly his last.

== Gameplay ==
The game starts where the novella ends, with Steve lying on the operating table and slipping into the dream world. Steve is controlled by the player through numerous surreal worlds. He can collect certain weapons and items on these levels, but cannot carry them to another level, with a few exceptions. Steve has no health meter, but there is a heart rate monitor, which goes from 75bpm (normal) to 100bpm (in frightening situations) to 170bpm (shortly before death). He immediately dies if he comes into contact with an enemy or an obstacle. He can also die if he remains too long in certain areas such as the Country Garden, where a lawnmower will come and kill him. When Steve dies, the game returns to the scene in the operating room where the surgeons attempt to save him, only to flatline and then for his heart to start back up. If the player gets a Game Over, Steve will flatline and his heart will not beat again, returning the player to the title screen. There are no save points in the game, and instead of score points the player's progress is stated as a percentage and a time counter.

There is an in-game cheat code for infinite lives, available in the Hall of Mirrors, which functions as a Hub level. The player has to be standing halfway in the right-hand-side mirror (at the point where Steve looks like a blob) and then input the Morse code for S.O.S. (3 short strikes, 3 long strikes, 3 short strikes). The specific key used for input is either the 'Help' key on the Atari ST version, or the numerical '+' key on the MS-DOS version (i.e. the plus key on the keyboard's numerical pad). Subsequently, pressing Help/Numerical+ on any section of a level will allow the player to skip said section. Pressing Help/Numerical+ in the Hall of Mirrors will disable the cheat. Having the cheat enabled allows the player to respawn immediately where the player died instead of having to watch the "operating table" scene.

There are 15 different enemies/challenges, 7 different death animations, and 5 different musical scores by C64/Amiga musician David Whittaker on the Amiga. Barry Leitch did the music for the Commodore 64 and PC version. The game also features a couple of traditional compositions including Country Gardens and Dance of the Sugar Plum Fairy.

After defeating the final boss, Steve wakes up on the operating table, as when the player loses a life, but without flatlining. The surgeon in the bottom right grins madly at the camera while holding a knife. The screen cuts to black.

== Development ==
The general plot was conceived by the developers, and Rupert Goodwins was asked to write the novella included with the game.

The scenarios in the game are not based on Serrano's own nightmares, but are inspired by the paintings of Salvador Dalí, Terry Gilliam's cartoon animations for Monty Python, and on odd observations. After a visit to the dentist, Serrano developed a phobia of teeth, which is noticeable in the design of the monsters, many of them having mouths with large teeth.

The game took over a year to produce.

== Release ==
Computer and Video Games did a competition called "Ooooh What a Nightmare Compo", which required participants to send a picture of their worst nightmares. The judging was done by a professional artist and the winners received blow-up fish bathtoys and Weird Dreams/Motormouth T-Shirts as prizes.

== Reception ==
Reception

Review scores
Publication	Score
Computer and Video Games	31%
The One	90%
ST/Amiga Format	81%
Amiga Action	71%
The Games Machine	64%
Zzap!64	60%

Weird Dreams received mixed reviews. While most critics praised its visual style, there were some criticisms depending on the game platform. Frustrating difficulty, long loading times, and a disappointing soundtrack were common criticisms, albeit not unanimous.
