= Angelo Zgorelec =

Croatian publisher (1940–2025)

- Anđelko Zgorelec
- Born: 1940; Koprivnica, Banovina of Croatia, Kingdom of Yugoslavia
- Died: 17 April 2025 (aged 84–85); London, England

Angelo Zgorelec (1940 – 17 April 2025) was a Croatian-born publisher who was the founder of the first British personal computer magazine, Personal Computer World (PCW).

== Biography ==
Anđelko Zgorelec was born in the Croatian city of Koprivnica and moved to the UK on a seasonal job in the 1960s. He worked odd jobs and at some point worked in newspaper distribution, where he noticed how newspapers about computers mostly came from the US, and decided to start a British paper about computers together with Meyer Solomon.

He published the first issue of Personal Computer World in February 1978 and continued publishing the first 16 monthly issues by himself. In August 1979, Felix Dennis took a majority stake in the magazine and the exhibition PCW Show. Two years later, the magazine was sold to the Dutch company VNU. It closed in 2009.

Zgorelec continued working in publishing for the next 20 years, with some smaller titles such as Office at Home, Practical Electronics, Program Now, and Astronomy Now which was edited by Sir Patrick Moore. He also started the European astronomy show Astrofest.

Zgorelec died on 17 April 2025.
