= CRN (magazine) =

American computer trade magazine

- Cover of the June 2023 issue
- Categories: Trade magazine
- Founded: 1982
- First issue: June 7, 1982
- Company: The Channel Company
- Country: United States
- Based in: Westborough, Massachusetts
- Language: English; German
- Website: www.crn.com

CRN is an American computer publication. It was first launched as Computer Retail Week on June 7, 1982, as a magazine targeted to computer resellers. It soon after was renamed Computer Reseller News.

== History and profile ==
Originally launched in 1982 and published by CMP Media of Manhasset, New York, United States, CRN was subsequently purchased by London-based United Business Media (UBM) as part of the $920 million acquisition of CMP. Computer Reseller News later changed its name to the acronym CRN and was published by franchise publishers in a number of other countries including Australia, Denmark, Germany, the Netherlands, India, Poland, Russia, the United Kingdom, and the United States. The Australian CRN was published by nextmedia for some years. the UK version of CRN was published by Incisive Media for some years after it acquired VNU Business Publications UK in 2007 and the U.S. version is published by The Channel Company which acquired UBM Channel under management buyout from UBM in 2013.

The headquarters of the magazine is in Westborough, Massachusetts. In 2009 CRN's U.S. version was recognized as a leading advertising medium for the IT industry by B2B's Media Power 50 ranking, which called it the "unrivaled leader in covering the channel".

In January 2012, the UK version of CRN launched the CRN Sales and Marketing Awards. These awards recognise and reward the achievements of high-achieving information and communications technology companies.

In April 2022, The Channel Company acquired CRN UK, Computing, and Channel Partner Insight from Incisive Media. This deal reunited the UK and US edition of CRN under common ownership.

In 2023, The Channel Company relaunched CRN Germany.

In March 2025, The Channel Company relaunched CRN Australia under an in-house management after previously licensed the brand to nextmedia.
