= Neil Aspinall =

British music industry executive (1941–2008)

- Aspinall in 2006
- Born: 13 October 1941; Prestatyn, Wales
- Died: 24 March 2008 (aged 66); New York City, U.S.
- Occupations: Road manager, personal assistant, record producer, executive
- Years active: 1961–2007
- Spouse: Suzy Aspinall (née Ornstein)
- Children: 5

Neil Stanley Aspinall (13 October 1941 – 24 March 2008) was a British music industry executive. A school friend of Paul McCartney and George Harrison, he went on to head the Beatles' company Apple Corps.

The Beatles employed Aspinall first as their road manager, which included driving his old Commer van to and from shows, both day and night. After Mal Evans started work for the Beatles, Aspinall was promoted to become their personal assistant, later becoming chief executive of their company, Apple Corps. He was one of several Beatles associates to earn the nickname "the fifth Beatle".

On behalf of Apple, Aspinall was involved in court cases against Allen Klein, EMI and Apple Computer. He supervised the marketing of music, videos and merchandising, as well as being a director of Standby Films, which was run from his home in Twickenham, London. On 10 April 2007, Aspinall retired from Apple Corps and died of lung cancer in New York in 2008.

== Early life ==
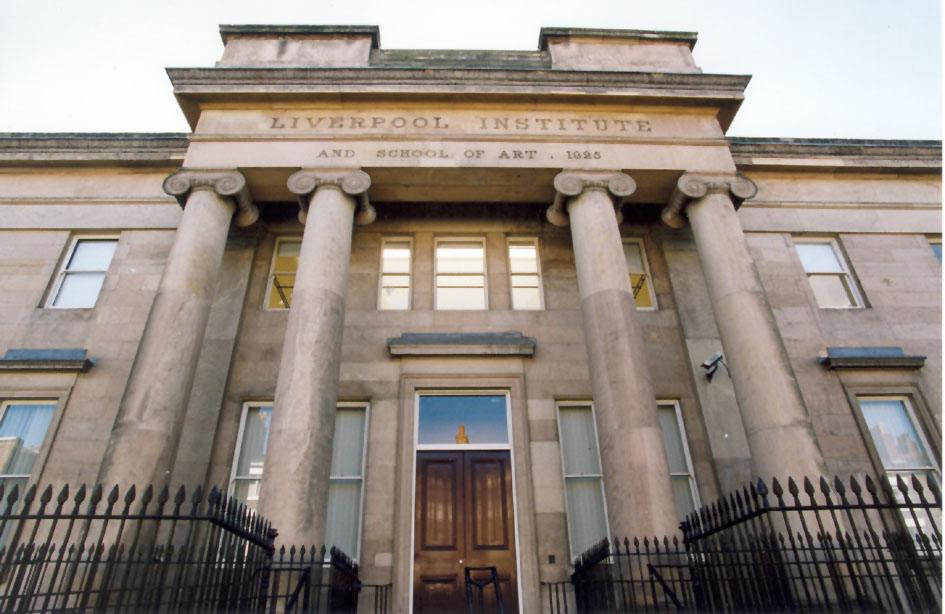
The Liverpool Institute, which Aspinall, McCartney and Harrison attended

Aspinall was born in Prestatyn, North Wales, after his mother had been evacuated from the family home in Liverpool because of the air-raids on Liverpool during the Second World War, while Aspinall's father was away at sea with the Royal Navy. Aspinall and his mother returned to Liverpool later in 1942 after the bombing had subsided. Aspinall later attended West Derby School, where he passed his 11-Plus exams. When he was twelve years old, Aspinall gained a place at the Liverpool Institute in Mount Street, and was in the same class as Paul McCartney for English and Art lessons.

Aspinall later commented about his first meeting with George Harrison, who also attended the Liverpool Institute: "My first encounter with George was behind the school's air-raid shelters. This great mass of shaggy hair loomed up and an out-of-breath voice requested a quick drag of my Woodbine. It was one of the first cigarettes either of us had smoked. We spluttered our way through it bravely but gleefully. After that the three of us did lots of ridiculous things together.... By the time we were ready to take the GCE exams we added John Lennon to our 'Mad Lad' gang. He was doing his first term at Liverpool College of Art which overlooks the Liverpool Institute playground and we all got together in a students coffee bar at lunchtime." Aspinall took nine GCEs at the Institute and passed eight of them, failing French. Aspinall left school in July 1959 to study accountancy. Aspinall worked for a Liverpool company for two years, receiving a wage of £2-10s–0d. (£2.50 decimal equivalent) per week as a trainee accountant.

== The Beatles ==
The Beatles played at the opening of the Casbah Coffee Club on 29 August 1959, which was in the cellar of Mona Best's house. Aspinall later rented a room in the house and became very good friends with then-Beatle Pete Best. The Beatles had previously used public transport to travel to local bookings, however by February 1961, they were playing two or three shows per night at different locations needing their own transportation. Best asked Aspinall to be a part-time road manager for the band, so Aspinall bought an "old, grey and maroon Commer van" for £80, and charged each of the group five shillings (60d [old pence], or 25p [new post-1971 pence]) per concert. Harrison later said: "Our early van became the centre of attention every time it pulled up. It was brush-painted red and grey and from head to foot was covered in graffiti – girls' names, and things like 'I love you, John'. It looked interesting, but the moment anybody saw it they would feel free to write all over it." The Beatles returned from their second trip to Hamburg in July 1961, and Aspinall left his job to become their permanent road manager, as he was earning more money driving them around than he was earning by being an accountant.

The Beatles were driven down to London by Aspinall on New Year's Eve in 1962, for their Decca audition, but Aspinall lost his way, and the trip took ten hours. They arrived at 10 o'clock at night, and John Lennon said that they arrived "just in time to see the drunks jumping in the Trafalgar Square fountains." In 1963, Aspinall was joined by Mal Evans, who also helped set up the Beatles' equipment (and acted as a bodyguard) which freed Aspinall to concentrate on other duties, like arranging appointments or buying things for them, such as suits, boots, meals, or drinks.

Best was sacked from the Beatles on 16 August 1962, by manager Brian Epstein acting on behalf of Lennon, McCartney and Harrison. Accounts vary of Aspinall during this event. According to Mersey Beat editor Bill Harry, Aspinall was waiting downstairs in Epstein's NEMS record shop, and was the first one to talk to the by then ex-Beatle in the Grapes pub, across from the Cavern. Aspinall was furious and said that he would stop working for the band as well, but Best strongly advised him not to. Aspinall asked McCartney and Lennon at the next concert why they had fired Best and was told, "It's got nothing to do with you. You're only the driver." However, in a 2007 interview, Aspinall provided Beatles historian Mark Lewisohn with a distinctly different version of events, saying that he was physically present when Epstein sacked Best, that he told Best unprompted that he planned to continue working for the band, and that on his first subsequent encounter with the other band members, their first question to him was how Best had taken being sacked. Aspinall stayed with the band, ending his affair with Best's mother, a relationship that had led to the birth of baby Vincent "Roag" Best. Aspinall denied the story for years before publicly acknowledging that he was indeed Roag's father.

Aspinall worked closely with Epstein, who provided weekly notes for Aspinall to give to the group members detailing their concert appearances and the fees they would receive. The Beatles had to travel in Aspinall's van along with their equipment, but British roads in the early 1960s were notoriously pot-holed and slow to navigate. Ringo Starr remembered that the travelling never seemed to stop during the early tours of Britain in Aspinall's van, as they would be driven up and down Great Britain with one of the group in the passenger seat, but with the other three on a hard bench seat in the back.

=== Personal assistant ===
Aspinall's job as personal assistant consisted of driving to concerts and meetings, but mostly meant just being there whenever someone needed something. Aspinall went on the first trip to the United States, and when George Harrison became ill with a fever and had a temperature of 102 °F (39 °C), he was ordered to stay in bed, so Aspinall stood in for him for The Ed Sullivan Show camera rehearsals; however, Harrison was back in time for the final shooting. Before the cover of Sgt. Pepper's Lonely Hearts Club Band could be completed by Peter Blake, Aspinall was sent out to find photographs of all of the people that were to be shown on the front cover. Aspinall suggested the idea of Sgt. Pepper being the compere, who would introduce the group, and the reprise of the title song near the end of the album.

After recording sessions, Lennon, Harrison and Starr would be chauffeured back to their houses in the 'stockbroker belt' of Southern England, but Aspinall would often drive McCartney and Evans in an Austin Princess limousine to a late-night club to eat. The Bag O'Nails nightclub was one of their favourites, at 8 Kingly Street in Soho, London, as it also presented live music. They would eat steak, chips and mushy peas, but Aspinall would always take out a torch from his pocket (in the dimly lit club) to inspect the portions on each of their plates. This was to make sure that the portions were exactly as they had ordered, which McCartney always found amusing. Although Harrison, McCartney and Starr had passed their driving tests, Lennon didn't pass his driving test until 1965; however, he rarely drove himself due to being a notoriously bad driver by poorly navigating roads and failing to notice other traffic, and as a result, he was usually chauffeured to and from recording sessions and appointments by his own personal chauffeur.

=== Musical and film contributions ===
Although not a musician, Aspinall made minor contributions to a handful of the Beatles' recordings. He played a tamboura on "Within You Without You", harmonica on "Being for the Benefit of Mr. Kite!", some percussion on "Magical Mystery Tour", and was among the many participants singing on the chorus of "Yellow Submarine".

Aspinall made uncredited appearances in two films with Beatles connections, appearing as "Man with Hat on the Roadside" in Magical Mystery Tour and as one of the "Death Soldiers" in the John Lennon film How I Won the War.

=== Manager ===
Following the death of Epstein in August 1967, there was a vacuum in the management of the Beatles' affairs. The Beatles asked Aspinall to take over the management of Apple Corps in 1968, which had been founded in April of the same year. Aspinall later said that he only accepted the position after being asked, but did not want to do it full-time, and would only do it "until they found somebody else." George Martin (the Beatles' record producer) was against the idea, as he thought that Aspinall did not have the necessary social qualifications to be able to speak to the upper class executives at EMI. Aspinall accompanied McCartney and Lennon to New York on 11 May 1968, to announce the formation of Apple to the American Media. Apple Corps had five divisions: electronics, film, publishing, records and retailing. Aspinall later spoke of the Beatles' business arrangements:

We did not have one single piece of paper. No contracts. The lawyer, the accountants and Brian, whoever, had that. The Beatles had been given copies of various contracts, maybe, I don't know. I didn't know what the [recording] contract was with EMI, or with the film people or the publishers or anything at all. So it was a case of building up a filing system, find out what was going on while we were trying to continue doing something.

Derek Taylor (Apple's press officer) said that Aspinall hated being stuck in the Apple office (at 3 Savile Row) all through the recording of The White Album and Let It Be album. Life in the Apple office, however, was improved by having a chef and assistants at hand: "The liquor bill was £600 per month and the food bill was close to that." This was mostly due to Aspinall's and Peter Brown's four-course lunches with expensive wines in the dining room at Apple. After Allen Klein was brought in to be the Beatles' manager Aspinall was dismissed, but reinstated after complaints from the group, and because Klein realised that Aspinall was no threat to his control of the company. Klein lost a High Court action in 1971 (started by McCartney) but lawsuits between Klein and Apple kept Aspinall busy until 1977.

=== Apple Corps executive ===
In 1978, Aspinall instigated the first of three lawsuits on behalf of Apple Corps against Apple Computer, Inc. (now known as Apple, Inc.) for trademark infringement. The first suit settled in 1981 with an amount of £41,000 being paid to Apple by Apple Computer. As a condition of the settlement, Apple Computer was allowed to use its logo as long as it did not enter the music business. The second suit with Apple Computer arose in 1989, when Apple Corps sued Apple Computer over its Apple IIGS (which included a professional synthesiser chip) claiming violation of the 1981 settlement agreement. In 1991, a settlement of £13.5 million was reached. McCartney praised Aspinall for trademarking the Apple name worldwide, and called Aspinall "Mr. X" in the Apple Corps organisation.

In September 2003, Apple Computer, Inc. was again sued by Apple Corps, this time for the introduction of the iTunes Music Store and the iPod, which Aspinall and Apple Corps believed was a violation of the previous agreement for Apple Computer to not distribute music. The trial began on 27 March 2006 in the UK, and ended on 8 May 2006 in a victory for Apple Computer; the judge ruled the company's iTunes Music Store did not infringe on the trademark of Apple Corps. Aspinall was also involved in several court cases in which Apple Corps took action against EMI:

We have tried to reach a settlement through good faith negotiations and regret that our efforts have been in vain. Despite very clear provisions in our contracts, EMI persist in ignoring their obligations and duty to account fairly and with transparency. The Beatles and Apple are, once again, left with no choice but to sue EMI.

In the early 1990s, Aspinall became the executive producer for The Beatles Anthology; he, producer George Martin, and press officer Derek Taylor are the only non-Beatles seen in new footage for the documentary. He continued to advise the surviving Beatles, as well as Lennon's and Harrison's estates, and to supervise the marketing of music, music videos and merchandising. On 10 April 2007, it was announced by Apple that Aspinall had "decided to move on" and Jeff Jones—a longtime VP at Sony Legacy—was hired as CEO to oversee the back-catalogue. One of Aspinall's final tasks at Apple was to oversee the remastering of the Beatles' back-catalogue for an anticipated 2008 release.

== Personal life and death ==
In 1961 and 1962, Aspinall had become good friends with Pete Best and subsequently rented a room in the house where Best lived with his parents. During one of the extended business trips of Best's stepfather, the 19-year-old Aspinall became romantically involved with Best's mother, Mona Best, who was 17 years his senior. As a result, during this period, Aspinall fathered a child by Mona: Vincent "Roag" Best. Roag Best was born in late July 1962.

On 30 August 1968, Aspinall married Suzy Ornstein at the Chelsea Register Office, London, with Magic Alex as best man. McCartney, Starr and his wife attended, and were also at a surprise party held later in the King's Road, London. Suzy Aspinall is the daughter of Bud Ornstein, the late chief executive of United Artists Pictures (UK). Aspinall had met her during 1964/1965 when her father was the United Artists representative overseeing the production of the first two Beatles' films: A Hard Day's Night and Help!. They went on to have four children: daughters Gayla, Dhara, Mandy and son Julian. As well as his work for Apple Corps, Aspinall and his wife were the sole directors of their own Standby Films Ltd. company, which was run from their home in Twickenham, London until it was dissolved in June 2010. In 1999, Standby Films released a film about Jimi Hendrix, called Hendrix: Band of Gypsys.

Aspinall died of lung cancer in New York City in 2008. His funeral was at the Church of St Mary the Virgin in Twickenham. Stella McCartney, Yoko Ono, Barbara Bach (wife of Starr), George Martin, Pete Best and Pete Townshend attended the funeral, with Townshend playing Bob Dylan's "Mr. Tambourine Man" as a tribute. The private service was followed by Aspinall's burial at Teddington Cemetery. Aspinall left nearly £7 million in his will in a trust, with the income going to Suzy, his wife of 40 years.

== Sources ==
- Best, Pete; Best, Rory; Best, Roag (2002). The Beatles: The True Beginnings. ScreenPress Books. ISBN 978-1-901680-65-2.
- DiLello, Richard (2005). The Longest Cocktail Party. Canongate Books Ltd. ISBN 978-1-84195-602-2.
- Granados, Stefan (2004). Those Were the Days. Cherry Red Books. ISBN 978-1-901447-12-5.
- Lennon, Cynthia (2005). John. Hodder & Stoughton. ISBN 978-0-340-89512-2.
- Lewisohn, Mark (2013). The Beatles – All These Years – Extended Special Edition: Part Two: Volume One: Tune In. Little, Brown. ISBN 978-1-4087-0545-2.
- Miles, Barry (1997). Many Years From Now. Vintage-Random House. ISBN 0-7493-8658-4.
- Spitz, Bob (2005). The Beatles – The Biography. Little, Brown and Company. ISBN 978-0-316-80352-6.
- The Beatles (2000). Anthology (book). Weidenfeld & Nicolson. ISBN 0-304-35605-0.
- The Beatles (2003). The Beatles Anthology (DVD). Apple records. ASIN: B00008GKEG.
