= Alistair Taylor =

English personal assistant of Brian Epstein (1935–2004)

- Alistair Taylor on Visual Radio #81

Background information
- Also known as: Mr. Fixit
- Born: James Alistair Taylor; 21 June 1935; Runcorn, Cheshire, England
- Died: 9 June 2004 (aged 68) Chesterfield, Derbyshire, England
- Occupations: Personal assistant, general manager
- Years active: 1961–1969
- Label: Apple

James Alistair Taylor (21 June 1935 – 9 June 2004) was an English personal assistant of Brian Epstein, the manager of the Beatles. As an employee at Epstein's company NEMS, Taylor accompanied him when he first saw the Beatles perform, at the Cavern Club in Liverpool on 9 November 1961. Taylor subsequently worked as the group's so-called "Mr. Fixit", devising escape routes from crazed fans and assisting the band members in purchasing property. He later became general manager of Apple Corps but was fired soon after Allen Klein arrived to address the company's financial problems. Taylor published various memoirs of his years in the Beatles' employ, including Yesterday: The Beatles Remembered and With the Beatles.

== Biography ==
=== Early life ===
Born on Curzon Street, Runcorn, Cheshire, Taylor served his time in the Royal Air Force before working in a series of jobs as a mover, timber importer, and docker in the Liverpool Docks. He was then successfully interviewed by Brian Epstein for a job as a salesman at North End Music Stores (NEMS) in 1960. Epstein liked Taylor so much that he decided to offer him a job as his personal assistant in the shop.

=== Alleged role in Epstein's discovery of the Beatles ===
Epstein stated in his 1964 autobiography, A Cellarful of Noise, that he first heard about the Beatles through a customer named Raymond Jones enquiring about "My Bonnie", a single by Tony Sheridan with backing by the group. Taylor later claimed to have invented the name of Raymond Jones and placed an order for "My Bonnie" at the main NEMS shop. As he wrote in The Beatles Book (1997), Taylor thought NEMS was losing sales by not stocking the disc:

The truth is that we were being asked for My Bonnie but no one actually ordered it. Brian would order any record once we had a firm order for it. I thought that we were losing sales and I wrote an order in the book under the name Raymond Jones and, from that moment the legend grew.

Taylor's claim that Jones was his pseudonym has since been undermined by author Spencer Leigh, who located an actual person named Raymond Jones when writing an article for Mojo magazine. In his book The Best of Fellas, Leigh expanded on the story, writing that NEMS and Epstein had communicated with Jones to acknowledge their debt once the Beatles became famous. Beatles biographer Mark Lewisohn has since offered his opinion that the information given by Jones to Leigh is "verifiably correct".

=== The Cavern ===
Taylor accompanied Epstein to the Cavern Club when the latter first saw the Beatles play, at a Thursday lunchtime performance on 9 November 1961. Recalling the moment in a later interview, Taylor described them as "these four horrible young men on stage, dressed in black leather trousers, black jackets, smoking, drinking and making noise …"; he also found them "charismatic and exciting" and "sensational".

As Epstein's personal assistant, Taylor witnessed crucial moments in the Beatles' career and was present at the signing of the first contract with Epstein (which Taylor signed as "In the presence of:"). In 1962, Taylor worked for Pye Records for 15 months, and moved to London (before the Beatles) due to his wife's asthma.

=== "Mr. Fixit" ===
In 1963 Taylor returned to NEMS to work as general manager, receiving a salary of £1,550 per annum. He later said that as the Beatles began to achieve widespread popularity that year, the consensus among the group and their management was: "If we can last three years, it would be marvellous."

The Beatles named him "Mr. Fixit" for his ability to find solutions to their needs. His duties varied from simple tasks – such as buying the band members their cigarettes and hiring limousines – to devising their methods of escape from fans after live performances and organising their holiday trips. He was responsible for resolving the copyright issues surrounding the group's use of celebrity photographs on Peter Blake's cover for Sgt. Pepper's Lonely Hearts Club Band.

Taylor also assisted the Beatles with property matters. He acted as consultant to John Lennon on the purchase of Dorinish Island (Ireland) for £1,550, and served as the middle-man when Paul McCartney bought High Park, his Scottish farm, in 1966. In July the following year, Taylor arranged the money exchange for the band's attempted purchase of the Greek island of Leslo, where, despite Greece's recent military coup, they planned to live communally with their families, close friends and assistants. In author Peter Doggett's description: "Alistair Taylor was sent to the Mediterranean like a colonial governor seeking a winter retreat for a monarch."

When George Harrison and Pattie Boyd were house-hunting in 1969, the couple sought anonymity by having Taylor act as Boyd's respectable husband while Harrison adopted the role of chauffeur. On one inspection, author Alan Clayson writes, their unconvincing role play led to the owner "turn[ing] to Pattie to ask whether Mr Harrison wanted to see the house as well".

=== Inside Apple ===
Taylor in the "one-man band" advertisement

According to Taylor, following Epstein's death from a drug overdose in August 1967, NEMS was plagued by "dreadful in-fighting", as "everybody – Vic Lewis, Robert Stigwood – struggled to take control of The Beatles". In December 1967, Taylor and his fellow NEMS employees Peter Brown and Terry Doran left the company to work directly for the Beatles. At Lennon's invitation, he became general manager of the band's business empire, Apple Corps. An early success for Apple Records was the Welsh folk singer Mary Hopkin, whom Taylor tracked down (at McCartney's suggestion) after she had appeared on the amateur talent show Opportunity Knocks.

In April 1968, Taylor appeared in a print advertisement to promote Apple and attract new artists to its nascent record label and publishing company. Designed by McCartney, the picture showed Taylor disguised as a one-man band. The heading read, "This man has talent …"; text below it claimed: "This man now owns a Bentley!" The disguise was rented in Soho, and Taylor was singing "When Irish Eyes Are Smiling" when the shot was taken. The ad resulted in an avalanche of tapes and other submissions after its publication in the New Musical Express and Rolling Stone. In her 2009 autobiography, Apple employee Chris O'Dell writes of Taylor's role in the company: "Alistair was here, there and everywhere at Apple, arranging this and that and always involved, it seemed, in fixing one problem or another."

That November, with the release of the band's double album The Beatles, his spoken voice appeared on Lennon's experimental track "Revolution 9". In what author Ian MacDonald describes as "a whimsical control-room exchange", Taylor can be heard apologising to George Martin, the Beatles' producer, asking forgiveness for not bringing him a bottle of claret. The previous year, Taylor and McCartney's random experimentation with musical notes and word association had led to McCartney writing the song "Hello, Goodbye". According to Taylor, however, his friendship with McCartney suffered when McCartney latter began a relationship with Linda Eastman. Taylor considered Eastman a "hard-faced star-chaser from the United States", eager to separate McCartney from any friends who had been close to his former fiancée, Jane Asher.

I got excuses from embarrassed wives and secretaries. I heard nervous Beatle voices in the background. But not one of my four famous friends came to the phone. And that hurt a hell of a lot more than getting the sack.

— Alistair Taylor, on his dismissal from Apple under Allen Klein

In Taylor's recollection, he called the four Beatles together in August 1968 and "told them to bring in a really good businessman" to address Apple's problems. Taylor later said of the excesses that brought about Apple's immediate financial difficulties: "[The Beatles] were handing money out to people like it was going out of fashion. People were being given cars and houses … it just got out of control."

The businessman hired to resolve the issues at Apple was New York accountant Allen Klein. Soon after Klein officially became manager of Apple Corps, in May 1969, Taylor was sacked from the company. O'Dell writes that although the "warning signs" were there, suggesting an unwelcome change at Apple, she was "shocked" at Klein's firing of Taylor, the Beatles' "beloved employee and friend". In his memoir With the Beatles, Taylor says of Klein: "He had all the charm of a broken lavatory seat."

More troubling to Taylor than his dismissal, the Beatles refused to accept his phone calls. Taylor said: "The next time I spoke to Paul was 20 years later."

=== After the Beatles ===
Taylor was recruited by Dick James after leaving Apple to work with Elton John, then an emerging artist. Taylor promoted the singer's first two albums. He moved into record producing for a short time but, along with his wife, Lesley, whom he had married in 1959, he felt it was time for a change. In 1973 the couple moved to Darley Dale in Derbyshire and bought a 200-year-old cottage. It was their home for the next 30-plus years.

The couple ran a tea-room in nearby Lea, and Taylor later worked in a factory and in a hotel before his retirement. He enjoyed participating in Beatles fan conventions around the world and he regularly appeared on radio both in the UK and the US.

In the mid-1990s, Taylor created Mellor Beach Leisure Ltd. Taylor served as the "business development director", promoting a new musical act called Smoke. The company folded after the band broke up. In 1998, he appeared in a documentary that was part of the British TV series Arena, in the episode "The Brian Epstein Story: The Sun Will Shine Tomorrow: Part 1". He also appeared in the 2003 documentary Inside John Lennon. Tapes from a 1996 interview were used in a BBC documentary I Was There When the Beatles Played the Cavern in 2011.

Taylor died in his sleep on 9 June 2004 in Chesterfield, Derbyshire, after a short bronchial illness. His wife, Lesley, died of cancer in October 2004.

== Artistic work ==
=== Books ===
He was the author of:

- Yesterday: The Beatles Remembered with Martin Robers, Pan Macmillan (7 April 1988) ISBN 0-283-99621-8
- Yesterday: My Life With the Beatles (a revised edition of the above) Movie Publisher Services (July 1991) ISBN 1-55698-292-5
- A Secret History (an inside account of The Beatles' rise and fall) John Blake (November 2001) ISBN 1-903402-24-7
- With the Beatles (a revised edition of the above) John Blake Publishing (1 September 2003) ISBN 1-904034-73-X

Taylor collaborated in his official biography:

- Hello Goodbye: The Story of Mr. Fixit by George Gunby, Yesterday Once More (2001) ISBN 0-9542120-0-2

=== Theatre ===
- "From Cavern to Rooftop", in which he spoke about his memories with interludes of Beatles music.

=== Tapes ===
He made a series of six audio tapes with the titles of: "From Cavern to Rooftop", "From Strawberry Fields to Magical Mystery Tour", "Remembering Brian", "Inside Apple" and "John" and "Paul". These are available as CDs from Yesterday Once More. Taylor also narrated A Beatles Liverpool Guide – Walk and Drive.

== Tributes ==
In 2016 Taylor was honoured with a blue heritage plaque at The Brindley theatre in Runcorn.
