= Aegean Center for the Fine Arts =

Fine arts school in Greece and Italy

Coordinates: 37.084725°N 25.148624°E

The Aegean Center for the Fine Arts was founded in 1966 by Brett Taylor, and has been overseen by its director, John Pack, since 1984. The center is an independent, non-profit program located in Paros, Greece and Pistoia, Italy. Courses are offered in two semester-long sessions per year as well as summer intensive workshops and include painting, drawing, photography, printmaking, creative writing, art history, literature and classical singing. The center accepts a maximum of 24 students into each of its semester programs.

Taylor was both a painter and musician who gained a passion for Greece from one of his teachers at the Tyler School of Art in Philadelphia. Taylor's writings described the intentions for his program: "...to get away from mass production and to meet a need for individualized instruction in an unfamiliar and very different setting which fosters a fresh perspective and independence..." Under the directorship of John Pack the Center has undergone many changes in its programs and infrastructure. The Center and its cause continues to thrive this half century plus since its founding.
