= Karen Bowerman =

British journalist and television presenter

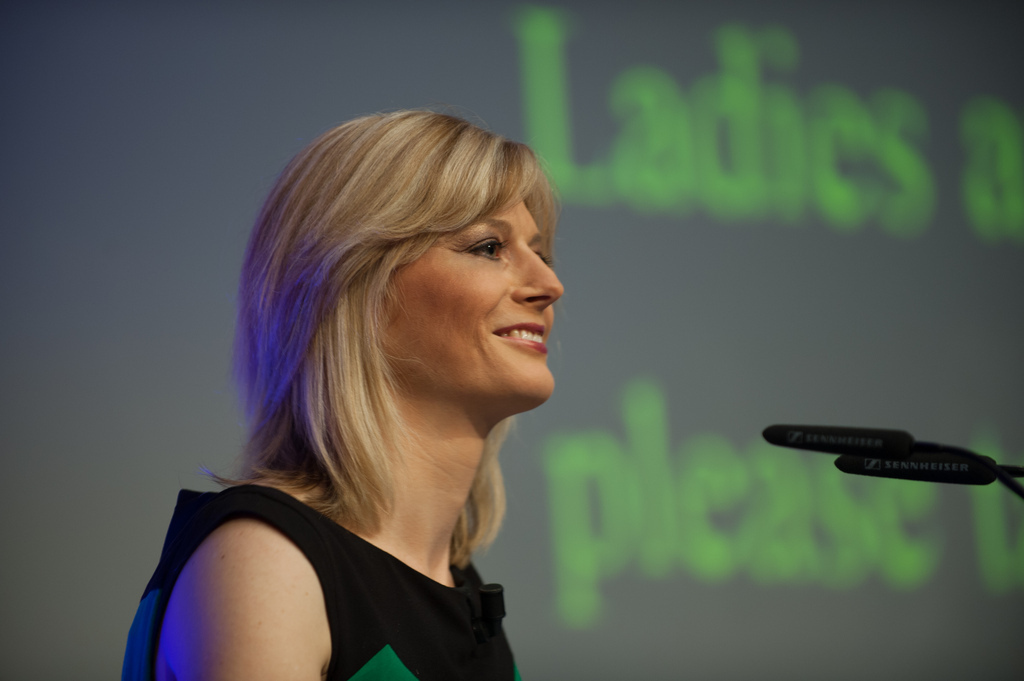
Karen Bowerman hosting conference in 2013

Karen Bowerman is an English journalist, television presenter, filmmaker and travel writer who has worked for Sky News, ITV, CNN International and the BBC. Formerly the Consumer Correspondent for BBC 1, and the Business and Consumer Presenter for the BBC News Channel and BBC World, she is now freelance, specialising in travel, consumer stories and personal finance.

She is a presenter and film maker for the BBC's Travel Show on BBC 2 and BBC World, works for The Press Association and contributes to the Independent, the Mail on Sunday, the Express, CNN.com and National Geographic Traveller. When not on assignment she is a corporate presenter.

== Education ==
Bowerman was an Academic Scholar at St Hugh's College, Oxford. She has an MA degree in Theology. She was subsequently offered a place at Wolfson College, Oxford, to study for a DPhil degree in Theology, but had to defer for a year to try to secure funding; she has never returned to complete the course. During this time she began working for a local paper.

== Career ==
After a brief spell in regional newspapers and TV, Bowerman became a BBC News Trainee, passed various law exams for journalists, and went on to report and present for BBC South West, Sky News and CNN International.

== BBC News ==
In 2002 Bowerman was employed as a consumer correspondent for the BBC News at One, BBC News at Six and the BBC News at Ten, where she specialised in undercover filming and special investigations. In 2006, she became a presenter on business and consumer affairs for the BBC News Channel while also reporting for BBC Radio 4 and newsreading for BBC Radio 5 Live. Bowerman was the interviewer during the interview of Guy Goma, a widely published blooper of the BBC.

== Programmes ==
After establishing herself in news, Bowerman worked as a contributor and presenter for BBC programmes. Stints include Weekend Watchdog, Newsnight, Fast:track (now The Travel Show) on BBC Two and The Heaven and Earth Show on BBC One. She also presented several series of BBC Northern Ireland's Watchdog and Fair Play on BBC One.

Bowerman also conceived and co-produced Test the Nation's Morals, a live show broadcast by BBC Religion that gave birth to a national equivalent.

== Films and documentaries ==
Since 2009 Bowerman has worked as a freelance travel reporter and film maker for the BBC's News Features department. She produces, shoots and presents her own material. Her short travel films have won several awards.

== Awards ==
Bowerman twice won "Travel Broadcaster of the Year" in the former UK Travel Press Awards, gaining recognition for films she shot and produced herself.

== Corporate work ==
Bowerman hosts international conferences, leads panel discussions and acts as a presenter for various corporate projects. Clients have included the UN, Mercedes, Hitachi, Danone, Swiss Re, Saga, Farnborough Air Show, the International Telecommunication Union and supermarkets.
