= Jeff Jones (music industry executive) =

American music executive

- Born: Arlington, Massachusetts
- Education: Massachusetts College of Art, New York University
- Employer: Apple Corps (CEO)
- Spouse: Susan Dodes

Jeff Jones is an American music industry executive, best known as the former CEO of Apple Corps, the company founded by the Beatles. Jones was formerly an executive vice president at Sony/BMG, where he managed Sony's recorded catalogs, including repackaging classic albums.

At Apple Corps he has overseen Beatles projects such as the launch of TheBeatles.com, the release of the band's remastered catalog on CD, iTunes, and vinyl, the DVD and Blu-ray releases of Help!, Yellow Submarine and Magical Mystery Tour, The Beatles: Rock Band, and the Cirque du Soleil collaboration, including the Grammy-winning Love album.

He also produced the compilations The Beatles in Mono and The Beatles Stereo Box Set, for which he won the 2011 Grammy Award for Best Historical Album.

== Early life, education ==
Jeff Jones is a native of the Boston suburb of Arlington, Massachusetts. He started his career in music in the record department of the Harvard Coop and went on to hold various positions at CBS Records, Sony Music, MCA Universal Recordings and PolyGram.

== Career ==
=== Marketing positions (1970s–2000) ===
After working in marketing and music since the mid-1970s, Jones joined as marketing director of Columbia Records in 1984, where he stayed for four years. Jones then left Columbia to serve as VP of marketing at MCA Records for two years. In 1991 he moved to the PolyGram Label Group to again serve as marketing VP. In 1993 Jones moved to Elektra Entertainment as VP of marketing. He gained the additional position of senior VP of jazz at Columbia Records in 2000. He also managed the Columbia Jazz A&R and Marketing departments.

=== Sony (1995–2007) ===
In 1995 Jones joined Sony as vice president of marketing and product development at Legacy Recordings, Sony's catalog division. He was promoted to senior VP of Legacy in 1998, and rose to executive vice president of Legacy, overseeing all of the division's operations. While with Legacy, Jones spearheaded such projects as the Miles Davis re-issues series, which earned multiple Grammy awards, and the historical Ken Burns JAZZ project.

=== Apple Corps (2007–2025) ===
Jones became the chief executive of Apple Corps, the company founded by the Beatles, in April 2007. He replaced long-time incumbent Neil Aspinall. Jones, a longtime Beatles fan, said his new job was "a dream come true".

At Apple Corps he has overseen Beatles projects such as the launch of TheBeatles.com, the release of the band's remastered catalog on CD, iTunes, and vinyl, the DVD and Blu-ray releases of Help!, Yellow Submarine and Magical Mystery Tour, The Beatles: Rock Band, and the Cirque du Soleil collaboration, including the Grammy-winning Love album.

In 2010, under his direction, the Beatles' catalogue was made available on iTunes through EMI, marking the first time Beatles music had ever been sold as digital downloads.

Jones took part in talks for the use of "Tomorrow Never Knows" in AMC series Mad Men, which was the first time a Beatles song had been used in an American television series. He also oversaw the release of Beatles box sets with remastered tracks, both stereo and The Beatles in Mono. As the compilation producer for The Beatles Stereo Box Set, Jones won a Grammy Award for Best Historical Album in 2011.

Jones is also the executive producer of the Beatles 2016 documentary "Eight Days A Week" directed by Ron Howard which won the Grammy for Best Music Documentary at the 59th Grammy Awards as well as the Critics' Choice Television Awards in 2016. In 2019, Jones headed production of the documentary "Get Back" about the penultimate recording sessions and final live performance of the Beatles on the roof of their headquarters. This series, using footage shot in 1969 by Michael Lindsay-Hogg, was directed by Peter Jackson with Jones and Ken Kamins as executive producers. The three part documentary is available on Disney+ and has won multiple awards. His last project is the documentary Beatles '64 released on 29 November 2024 on the same streaming service, coupled with The Beatles 1964 US Albums in Mono box set vinyl reissue the week before.

On 21 October 2024, it was announced the Jones would be stepping down as CEO of Apple. No replacement was immediately named. On July 1, 2025, Tom Greene replaced Jones as Apple CEO.

== Awards ==
Year	Category	Song/album	Role	Result
2011	Grammy Award for Best Historical Album	The Beatles Stereo Box Set	Producer	Won
