= PC Magazine (British magazine) =

Defunct British magazine

- Editor: Steve Malone
- Executive editor: Jerry Sanders
- Categories: Computer magazine
- First issue: January 1982; 44 years ago
- Final issue: 2002; 24 years ago
- Company: PCMag Digital Group (Ziff Davis)
- Country: United Kingdom
- Based in: PCMag
- Language: English
- Website: uk.pcmag.com
- ISSN: 0965-2132

There are several different versions of PC Magazine. The UK edition was taken over by VNU in 2000 and ceased publication in 2002, although they still maintain a website. As of 2026, the UK and US editions are once again owned by Ziff Davis and are online-only media outlets.

PC Magazine UK's launch edition was printed in January of 1982. Nine months prior to the launch, David Craver, head of Ziff-Davis UK, started recruiting technology journalists and columnists. Peter Jackson and Guy Kewney were star columnists, called fellows. Steve Malone was the launch editor, Jerry Sanders was Executive Editor in charge of reviews, and Ed Henning created ZD Labs UK, the technical backbone of the reviews.

The columnists of PC Magazine moved to Personal Computer World at the rival publisher IDG Publishing, the first British computer magazine, due to David Bunnell's Financial Backer selling the magazine to Ziff Davis in November of 1982.
