= PC Direct =

Defunct British computer magazine

PC Direct was a UK computer magazine published by Ziff Davis. The magazine was established in 1991, being one of the first magazines published by Ziff Davis outside the United States. VNU acquired PC Direct in 2000. It was shut down in 2001.
