= IT Week =

British magazine

IT Week was a weekly magazine for the UK computing industry, published by Incisive Media.

== History and profile ==
The magazine was launched on 18 May 1998. It was originally published by the UK subsidiary of American media company Ziff Davis. In late 2000, Ziff Davis sold all its UK print publications, including IT Week, to VNU. In January 2007, VNU's UK business was acquired by Incisive Media.

IT Week was originally envisaged as a UK equivalent of Ziff Davis's American computer trade weekly, PC Week (which was subsequently renamed eWeek).
