= Roy Disney =

Roy Disney may refer to:

- Roy O. Disney (1893–1971), partner and elder brother of Walt Disney
- Roy E. Disney (1930–2009), Roy O. Disney's son, director emeritus of the Walt Disney Company
