= Acron, Florida =

- Ghost town
- Location within Florida Location within the United States
- Coordinates: 29°00′06″N 81°31′12″W
- Country: United States
- State: Florida
- County: Lake
- Founded: 19th century

Acron is a ghost town in eastern Lake County, Florida. Established during the late 19th century, near Paisley, it is best known as the town where Flora Call and Elias Disney, the parents of Walt Disney, and Roy O. Disney lived for a short time after they were married in nearby Kismet on New Year's Day, 1888. The location, which is just northeast of Lake Akron, is about forty miles (64 km) due north of what is now Walt Disney World.
