= La Plata station (Missouri) =

Train station in La Plata, Missouri, US

La Plata, MO
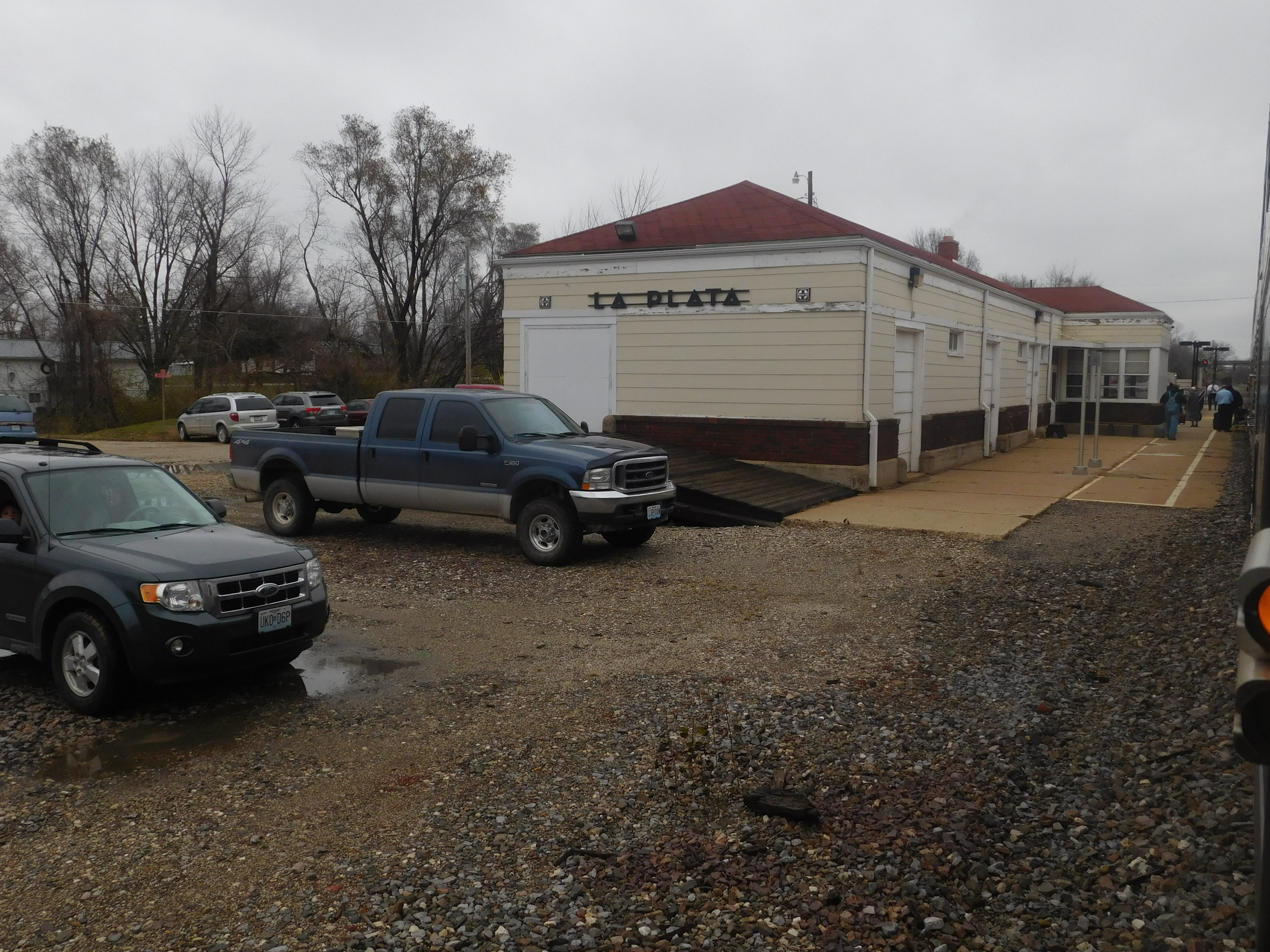
- La Plata station in November 2015

General information
- Location: 535 North Owensby Street; La Plata, Missouri
- Coordinates: 40.0291°N 92.4939°W
- Line: BNSF Marceline Subdivision
- Platforms: 1 side platform
- Tracks: 2

Construction
- Parking: Yes
- Accessible: Yes

Other information
- Station code: Amtrak: LAP

History
- Opened: January 1, 1888
- Rebuilt: –September 21, 1945; 1996–2001; 2022

Passengers
- FY 2025: 10,493 (Amtrak)

Services
Preceding station	Amtrak	Following station
Kansas City toward Los Angeles	Southwest Chief	Fort Madison toward Chicago
Former services
Preceding station	Amtrak	Following station
Marceline toward Dallas or Houston	Lone Star	Fort Madison toward Chicago
Preceding station	Atchison, Topeka and Santa Fe Railway	Following station
Elmer toward Los Angeles	Main Line	Gibbs toward Chicago
Location

La Plata station is an Amtrak train station in La Plata, Missouri, United States, served by the daily Southwest Chief. It was built in 1945 by the Atchison, Topeka and Santa Fe Railway as a replacement for an 1887-built, 1888-opened passenger and freight depot that was in deteriorating condition. Efforts to replace the station were stalled by a lack of construction material during World War II. The 1945 replacement was built in Art Deco style, and was restored between 1996 and 2001 by local preservationists, a model railroad club, and a garden club. The station was upgraded again in 2022 with upgrades done to the station building and the platform to bring it into compliance with the Americans with Disabilities Act. It also hosts two Virtual Railfan cameras.

== Nearby colleges ==
- Truman State University, north 12.5 miles (20.1 km) in Kirksville.
- A.T. Still University, north 13.7 miles (22.0 km) in Kirksville.
- Moberly Area Community College, south 45.9 miles (73.9 km) in Moberly.
