= Donn Tatum =

American businessman (1913–1993)

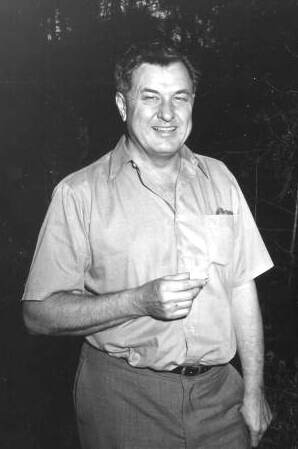
- Tatum c. 1963
- Born: Donn B. Tatum; January 9, 1913
- Died: May 31, 1993 (aged 80); Los Angeles, California, U.S.
- Occupations: Businessman; entertainment executive
- Years active: 1956–1992
- Title: President, Chairman and CEO of The Walt Disney Company (1968–1980)
- Term: 1968 – 1971 (President); 1971 – 1976 (CEO); 1971 – 1980 (Chairman)
- Predecessor: Roy O. Disney
- Successor: Card Walker

Donn B. Tatum (January 9, 1913 – May 31, 1993) was an American businessman and the first non-Disney family member to be an executive of Walt Disney Productions. Tatum held senior leadership positions with Disney for 25 years, becoming president from 1968 to 1971, when he became CEO from 1971 until 1976. His final position was "Director Emeritus" from 1992 until his death. He played a major role in the creation of the Walt Disney World Resort, EPCOT Center and Tokyo Disneyland.

== Early life ==
Tatum was born on January 9, 1913. He grew up in Los Angeles and graduated magna cum laude from Stanford University, with a Bachelor of Arts degree in political science and earned two law degrees from Oxford University. He passed the California bar in 1938 and became involved in entertainment law at Lillick, Geary and McHose.

He held a number of positions and was counsel for RCA, NBC and ABC. He became general manager of KABC-TV in Los Angeles and Western television director for ABC.

His daughter Melantha Kathleen Tatum-Bobrick is the mother of the actor and filmmaker Daniel Sea.

== Walt Disney Company ==
Tatum joined Disney as production business manager in 1956 and in 1971, became chief executive and board chairman following the death of Roy O. Disney — becoming the first non-Disney family member to head the company. Tatum was CEO until November 1976 when Card Walker took over but he remained chairman.

On June 3, 1980, he retired as chairman and CEO of Disney Productions turning over the company to Walker. He stayed on the Disney board as executive committee chair.

In 1993, Tatum was named a Disney Legend.

== Public service ==
He was CalArts board chairman and president of the Disney Foundation, California Broadcasting Assn., United Cerebral Palsy Assn. and Stanford Club of Los Angeles.

Tatum was a fellow of the Royal Society of Arts, London, and an honorary member of the Academy of Television Arts & Sciences and Hollywood Radio & Television Society.

He was a board member of The Huntington Library, California State Fair and Exposition, Los Angeles Philharmonic Association., Los Angeles Chamber of Commerce, Better Business Bureau of Los Angeles, the John Tracy Clinic, Western Digital, Union Oil, Bank of America and Greyhound Lines.

== Death ==
Tatum died on May 31, 1993, of cancer at his home in Pacific Palisades. Then Disney CEO Michael Eisner, and President Frank Wells said "He served as a director of the company until his resignation last year, when he was named director emeritus. The world will miss Donn, but we at Disney who looked to him for wisdom, guidance and balance will miss him more."

Business positions
Preceded by Roy O. Disney	President of The Walt Disney Company; 1968–1971	Succeeded by Card Walker
Preceded by Roy O. Disney	CEO of The Walt Disney Company; 1971–1976	Succeeded by Card Walker
Preceded by Roy O. Disney	Chairman of The Walt Disney Company; 1971–1980	Succeeded by Card Walker
