= Card Walker =

American businessman

Esmond Cardon Walker
- Walker in 1982
- Born: January 9, 1916; Rexburg, Idaho, U.S.
- Died: November 28, 2005 (aged 89); La Cañada Flintridge, California, U.S.
- Occupations: Businessman; entertainment executive
- Years active: 1938–2000
- Title: President, Chairman and CEO of The Walt Disney Company (1971–1983)
- Term: 1971 – 1983
- Predecessor: Donn Tatum
- Successor: Ron W. Miller; Raymond Watson
- Spouse: Winnie Walker (m. 1948)
- Children: 3

Esmond Cardon Walker (January 9, 1916 – November 28, 2005), commonly known as E. Cardon Walker or Card Walker, was an American businessman who served as a top executive at Walt Disney Productions from the 1960s through the 1980s. He was born in Rexburg, Idaho.

== Early life and career ==
Walker moved to Los Angeles, California, in 1916, where he attended UCLA. After graduation, he began his career at Disney as a mailroom clerk in 1938. He went on to work in the camera department and later became a unit manager for short subjects.

In 1941, Walker was forced to delay his Disney career to serve in the United States Navy during World War II. He was the flight control officer (flight deck officer) aboard the aircraft carrier USS Bunker Hill (CV-17) in the Pacific Theater from 1943 to 1945, surviving eight major battles. After the war, he returned to the Disney Studio. In 1956, he became the vice president of advertising and sales before being elected to the board of directors in 1960.

== Career with Disney ==
Two years after Walt Disney's death in 1966, Walker became executive vice president and chief operating officer. When Walt's brother Roy O. Disney died in 1971, Walker became company president, serving under chairman and CEO Donn Tatum. In November 1976 Walker took over chief executive officer duties from Tatum while retaining the responsibilities of president. In 1977 Walker was awarded an Honorary Doctorate from Florida Institute of Technology. Finally, in 1980 Walker became chairman of the Disney board upon Tatum's retirement. Walker himself retired as CEO three years later, in February 1983, but stayed on as chairman until August 1984 to oversee the opening of Tokyo Disneyland in Japan.

As a top Disney executive, Walker played a major part in the early development of Walt Disney World in Florida. He also sought to expand Disney's presence to international territory. EPCOT and Tokyo Disneyland both opened under Walker's leadership, and he presided over the dedications of both parks. Walker approved the creation of the Disney Channel in 1982.

Walker continued to serve as a consultant to the company until 1990 and was member of the board of directors until 2000, having served 40 continuous years on the Disney board. His contributions culminated in his induction into the Disney Legends in 1993.

== Death ==
Walker died at age 89 in La Cañada Flintridge, California, due to congestive heart failure.

Business positions
Preceded by Donn Tatum	President of The Walt Disney Company; 1971–1980	Succeeded by Ron W. Miller
Preceded by Donn Tatum	CEO of The Walt Disney Company; 1976–1983	Succeeded by Ron W. Miller
Preceded by Donn Tatum	Chairman of The Walt Disney Company; 1980–1983	Succeeded by Raymond Watson
