= Elias Disney =

Father of Walt and Roy Disney

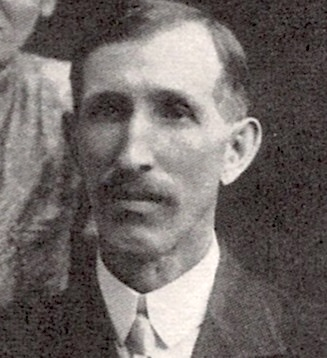
- Disney in 1913
- Born: February 6, 1859; Bluevale, Canada West (now Ontario)
- Died: September 13, 1941 (aged 82); Los Angeles, California, U.S.
- Resting place: Forest Lawn Memorial Park, Glendale, California, U.S.
- Occupation: Businessman
- Spouse: Flora Call (m. 1888; died 1938)
- Children: 5, including Roy and Walt
- Relatives: Disney family

Elias Charles Disney (February 6, 1859 – September 13, 1941) was a Canadian construction worker and entrepreneur. He was best known as the father of Roy and Walt Disney, co-founders of the Walt Disney Company. Elias was a strict and hardworking man who played a major role in shaping his sons' early lives, instilling in them a strong work ethic. He spent his early years as a construction worker for the World's Columbian Exposition, which was the inspiration for Disney's son, Walt Disney, and the Disney Kingdom he eventually created. His entrepreneurial tendencies were passed on to his son Walt, despite financial difficulties and business setbacks.

== Early life ==
Disney was born in the rural village of Bluevale, in what is now Ontario, Canada, to Irish Protestant immigrants Kepple Elias Disney and Mary Disney (née Richardson). Both parents had emigrated from Freshford, County Kilkenny in Ireland to Canada as children, accompanying their parents. His parents would have eight other children in the following 18 years after the birth of Elias. Disney's father owned a farm and got into a variety of other business ventures to make money. The name Disney is derived from the Norman name D'Isigny.

He moved to California with his father in 1878 in hopes of finding gold. Instead, Kepple was convinced by an agent of the Union Pacific Railroad to buy 200 acres (81 ha) of land near Ellis, Kansas. When the family moved, they would let go of their previously conservative ways with the exception of Elias. In Ellis, Disney attempted to live as an orange grower and failed.

== Career ==
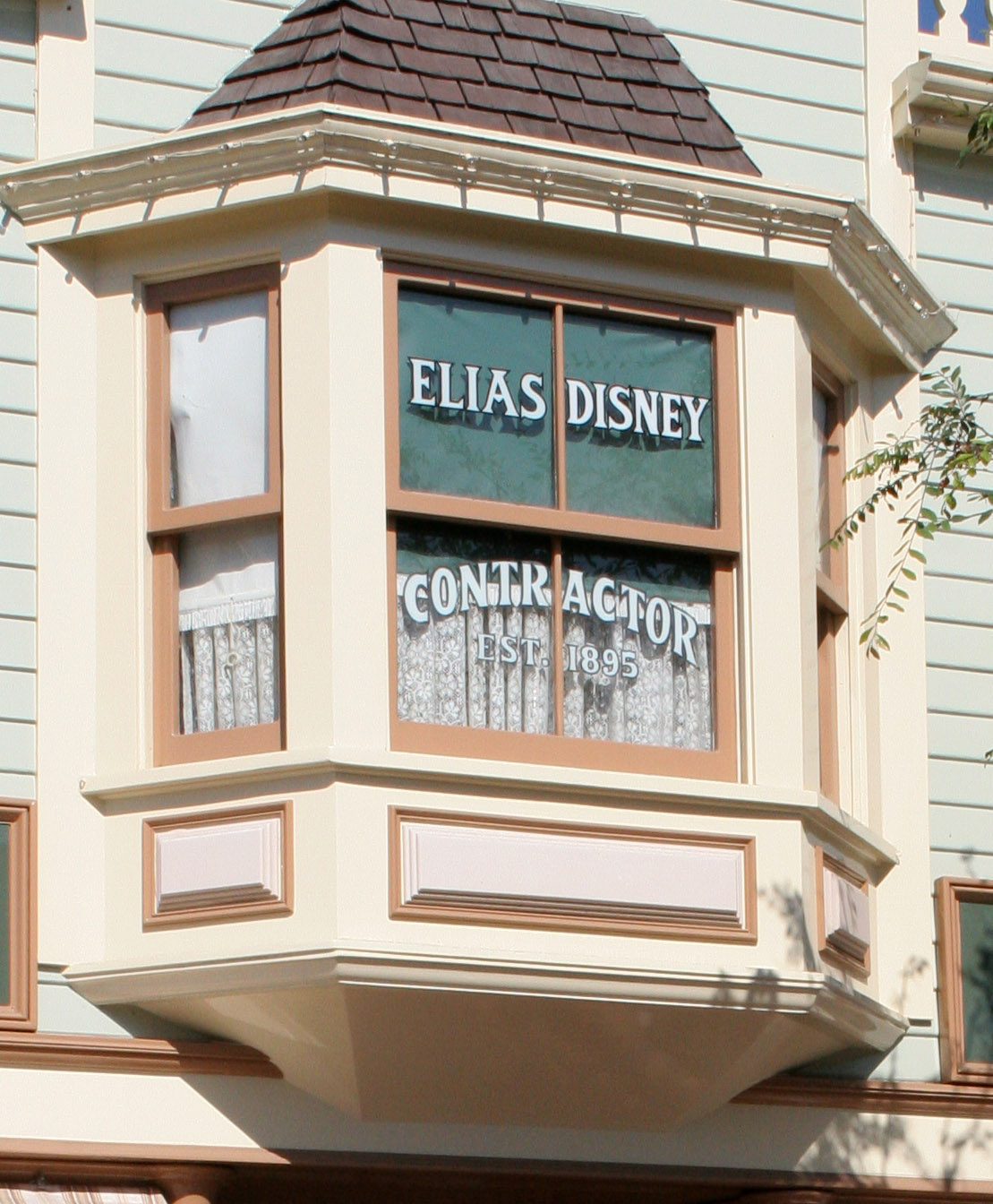
Disney's son, Walt, paid tribute to his father with a small sign on his Main Street USA attraction at Disneyland which is still in place today. It reads, "ELIAS DISNEY, CONTRACTOR, EST. 1895."

=== Farming, fiddling and work on the railroad ===
Disney worked on his father's new farm until 1884, when he left to find another job. He was hired in a railroad machine shop for the Kansas Pacific Railroad (one of his co-workers was Walter Chrysler), then he joined the railroad crew building the Union Pacific line through Colorado. After the railroad contract was over, he became a professional fiddle player in Denver. Again he was unsuccessful, and he returned to his father's farm.

=== Hotelier, mailman and orange-growing ===
Disney also worked for a short time as a mailman in Kissimmee, Florida, close to the eventual site of Walt Disney World. Disney also attempted to make a career as an orange grower in Kissimmee, buying 160 acres (65 ha), but he was unsuccessful. After this he would decide to move to Chicago, leaving Florida during the late spring of 1890. Although frequently unsuccessful at self-employment, Disney's entrepreneurial tendencies were passed on to his son Walt.

=== Construction ===
He would be a construction worker for the 1893 World's Columbian Exposition in Chicago, an event which author Erik Larson suggests was a source of inspiration for his son Walt and the Disney kingdom he would eventually create. He bought shares of O-Zell Company, a jelly-canning factory that also produced apple juice in Chicago, where his son Walt Disney worked before he joined the Red Cross Ambulance Corps in World War I. The family would live at 3515 South Vernon Avenue in the Fourth Ward by 1890. On October 31, 1891, Disney bought a lot at 1249 Tripp Avenue By 1892, he had built a house on it. The neighborhood was called Hermosa and had been settled by Scottish, German, and Scandinavian immigrants. Their next two children were born there. The family would move into the new home located on Tripp Avenue on June 24, 1893, and shortly afterwards Flora give birth to a baby boy, Roy O. Disney. Disney wanted to name him Columbus but Flora wanted him to be named Roy instead, and Roy was picked. When it came to deciding on a middle name, there would be issues. One day, Flora saw a lumber truck on Tripp Avenue with the company name of Oliver Lumber Company painted across the sides of it. After seeing this truck, Elias and Flora would decide that Oliver would be Roy's middle name.

By the turn of the century, Disney had become an active building contractor. He built houses which he owned and then resold. He also built the Saint Paul Congregational Church, a building dedicated on October 14, 1900. Disney was one of the church's trustees, while his wife was its treasurer.

=== Crane farm ===
A neighboring family had two adolescent children involved in a car barn robbery, and Disney feared that crime would taint his own children. On March 5, 1906, he bought a 40-acre (16 ha) farm near Marceline, Missouri, for $3,000, or $75 per acre. Its previous owner William E. Crane had died in November 1905. Crane was a veteran of the American Civil War, and his house predated the foundation of Marceline. On April 3, Disney bought an adjoining tract of about 5 acres (2 ha) from Crane's widow for an additional $450. Marceline was still accessible from Chicago but provided a rural setting, and Disney's younger brother Robert owned a 440-acre (180 ha) farm west of the city. Disney and his family settled on the farm in April.

The Crane Farm had orchards of apples, peaches, and plums and fields of grain. The farm animals included pigs, chickens, horses, and cows. The Disneys had a telephone connection by 1907. In 1907, Disney convinced some of his fellow farmers to join the American Society of Equity, a farmer's union aiming to consolidate the members' buying power.

Herbert and Raymond Disney never liked life on the farm. They moved out around the fall of 1908, heading back to Chicago, where they found work as clerks.

The family sold the farm on November 28, 1910, as Disney fell ill. He was suffering from typhoid fever, followed by pneumonia. The Disneys lived in a rented house in Marceline, probably at 508 North Kansas Avenue, until 1911, when they moved to Kansas City, Missouri. They lived in a rented house at 2706 East Thirty-first Street. They stayed there until they bought their own modest home in September 1914. It was situated at 3028 Bellefontaine Street.

=== Newspapers and O-Zell ===
On July 1, 1911, Disney purchased a newspaper delivery route for The Kansas City Star. It extended from the Twenty-seventh Street to the Thirty-first Street, and from Prospect Avenue to Indiana Avenue. Roy and Walt were put to work delivering the newspapers. The Disneys delivered the morning newspaper Kansas City Times to about 700 customers and the evening and Sunday Star to more than 600. Their customers increased with time. Disney also delivered butter and eggs to his newspaper customers. They were imported from a dairy farm in Marceline.

Disney sold the paper route on March 17, 1917. He had been investing in the O-Zell Company of Chicago since 1912 and moved back to the city in 1917 to take an active role in its management. The Disneys rented a flat at 1523 Ogden Avenue.

=== Retirement and carpentry ===
He retired from management work in 1920 and moved back to Kansas City. He was again listed as a carpenter. He moved to Portland, Oregon, by the fall (autumn September–October) of 1921. His son Herbert had earlier moved to this city.

== Personal life ==
=== Marriage and family ===
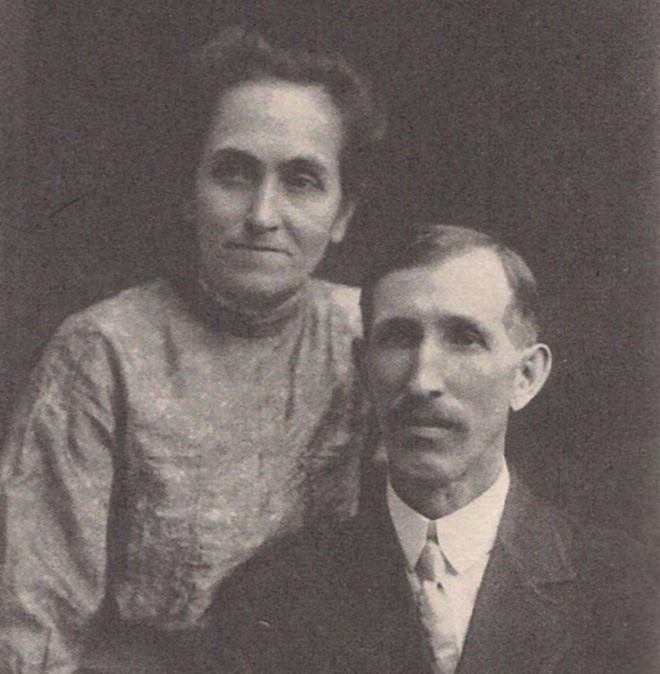
Elias (right) and his wife Flora, 1913

Disney's sister Annie would become a teacher at the Beaver Bank School located adjacent to the family farms starting in 1884. Elias would sometimes fill in as a substitute teacher for his sister, and there he started to get to know and eventually develop a relationship with one of her students, Flora Call. After she graduated, Flora's parents would sell their land in Ellis and move to Acron, Florida, with Disney following suit wanting to be with Flora. Elias and Flora were married in Acron on January 1, 1888 in Kismet, Lake County, Florida, 50 miles (80 km) north of the land on which Walt Disney World would eventually be built and lived for a short time in adjoining Acron, Florida. She was the daughter of his father's neighbors.Their marriage license was the first license ever issued by Lake County. Disney and his wife would move to Daytona Beach and manage the Halifax Hotel during the "tourist season of 1888" but left when the owner no longer needed a manager and kicked the two out of their rooms. They would have a son, Herbert, in December 1888.

Soon after marriage, the Disneys moved to Chicago, Illinois, where Disney met and befriended Walter Parr, St. Paul Congregational Church's preacher for whom the Disneys' fourth son Walt was named.

The couple had five children:

- Herbert Arthur Disney (December 8, 1888 – January 29, 1961, aged 72), letter carrier (1940 US Census)
- Raymond Arnold Disney (December 30, 1890 – May 24, 1989, aged 98), self-employed insurance broker (1940 US Census)
- Roy Oliver Disney (June 24, 1893 – December 20, 1971, aged 78), businessman and co-founder of The Walt Disney Company
- Walter "Walt" Elias Disney (December 5, 1901 – December 15, 1966, aged 65), entrepreneur and co-founder of The Walt Disney Company
- Ruth Flora Disney (December 6, 1903 – April 7, 1995, aged 91), philanthropist

Disney was a member of the Congregational Church and often preached stern sermons on Sundays in this church. His son Walter Elias Disney was named after a Congregationalist minister named Walter Parr. Disney and Walt had a tense relationship as Disney never saw Walt's profession as an artist as a real job. Disney's son Raymond Arnold Disney named his son Charles Elias Disney after his father Elias Charles Disney.

=== Beliefs and habits ===
Disney never drank alcohol and rarely smoked. According to biographical accounts, Disney was a stern man who could have a strong temper at times and would take the money his sons earned for "safekeeping," considering them too young to know the value of money. If his children misbehaved, Disney would not hesitate to punish them with a switch. Disney was an ardent socialist and a supporter of Eugene Debs. Disney would talk socialism with various people and bring them home. He was a fiddler and would bring home anyone else who could play an instrument.

=== Death ===
Disney died on September 13, 1941, in Los Angeles aged 82. He is interred in Forest Lawn Memorial Park at Glendale, California.

== Sources ==
- Barrier, J. Michael. (2007), "The Pet in the Family: On the Farm and in the City, 1901–1923", The Animated Man: A Life of Walt Disney, University of California Press, ISBN 978-0520241176
