= Carrollton station =

Former train station in Carrollton, Missouri, US

Carrollton, MO

General information
- Location: 800 South Main Street; Carrollton, Missouri; United States
- Coordinates: 39°20′57.8″N 93°29′49.3″W

History
- Opened: 1973
- Closed: 1979

Former services
Preceding station	Amtrak	Following station
Kansas City toward Dallas or Houston	Lone Star	Marceline toward Chicago
Preceding station	Atchison, Topeka and Santa Fe Railway	Following station
Palemon toward Los Angeles	Main Line	Bosworth toward Chicago
Location

Carrollton station is a former Amtrak railway station in Carrollton, Missouri, United States. The station opened in 1973, but had no train service until 1974 when Amtrak's Lone Star began service to Carrollton. The Lone Star was discontinued in October 1979, ending service to Carrollton. The station building still stands there today.

In May 2022, the Missouri General Assembly announced that the state's approved operating budget would includes $1 million in funding for a proposed new stop in Carrollton.
