= Walt Disney Hometown Museum =

Marceline, MO
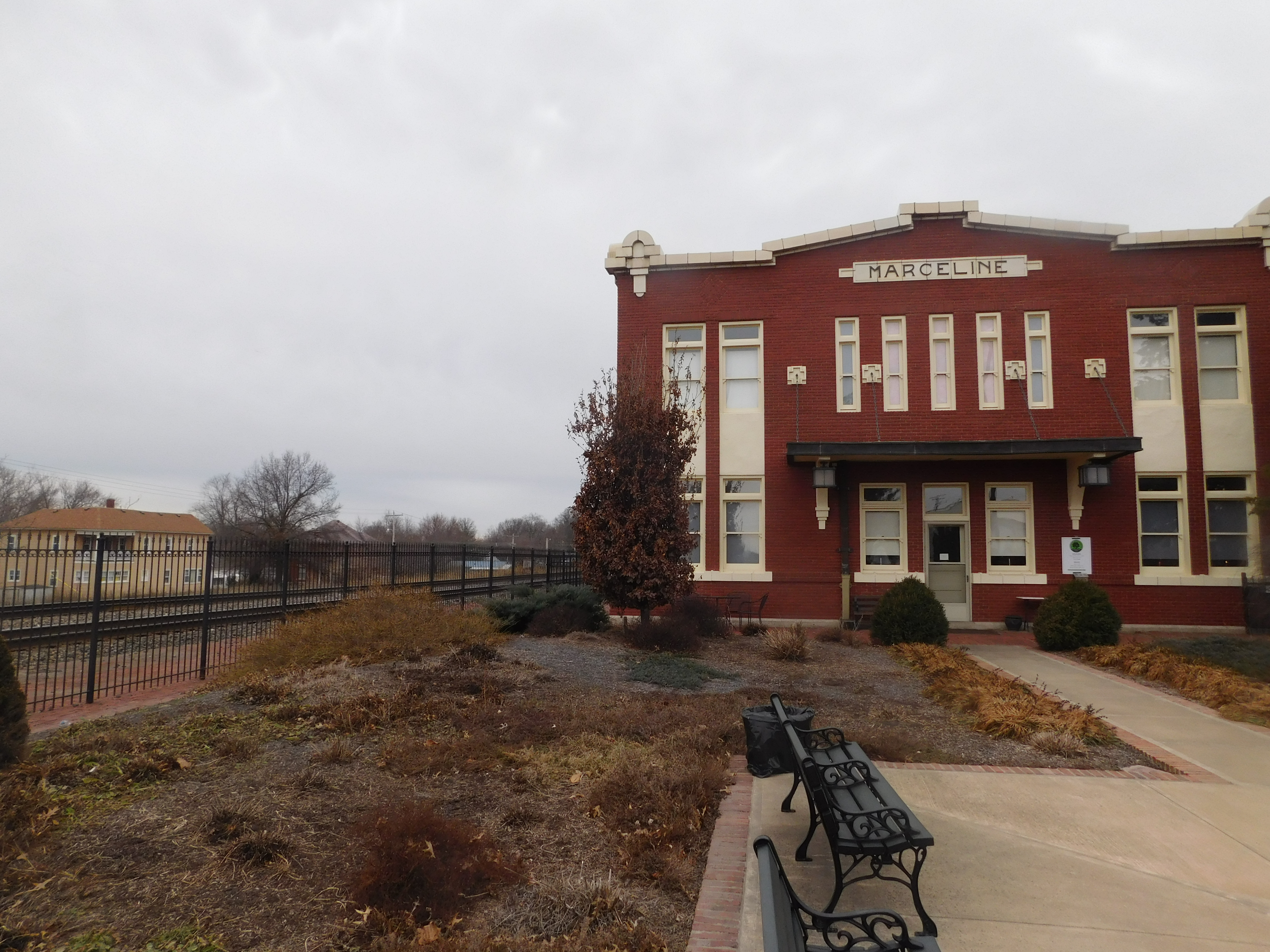
- The Walt Disney Hometown Museum, located in the former Atchison, Topeka and Santa Fe Railway depot.

General information
- Location: 120 East Santa Fe Avenue, Marceline, Missouri 64658

History
- Opened: March 6, 1888
- Closed: May 11, 1997
- Rebuilt: 1913

Former services
Preceding station	Amtrak	Following station
Carrollton toward Dallas or Houston	Lone Star	La Plata toward Chicago
Kansas City toward Los Angeles	Southwest Chief	La Plata toward Chicago
Preceding station	Atchison, Topeka and Santa Fe Railway	Following station
Rothville toward Los Angeles	Main Line	Bucklin toward Chicago
- Walt Disney Hometown Museum
- Location within Missouri Location within the United States
- Established: 2001
- Location: 120 E. Santa Fe Avenue, Marceline, Missouri
- Coordinates: 39.7159°N 92.9476°W
- Type: Hall of Memory
- Key holdings: Walt Disney family memorabilia
- Website: waltdisneymuseum.org
Location

The Walt Disney Hometown Museum is located in the restored Santa Fe Railway Depot in Marceline, Missouri. Opened in 2001, the museum houses a collection of memorabilia from the Disney family's farm where they lived from 1905 to 1909 along with Walt Disney's return to the town in 1946.

Many of the items were donated by the family of Ruth Flora Disney Beecher, Walt's sister. Artifacts include personal family letters and photos, Disney's wooden school desk and a recording of him asking his parents about their life. The museum houses the only remaining components of a Disneyland ride to be operated outside of Disneyland, the Midget Autopia. The museum also houses artifacts from the town's railroad history, including ATSF 5008, an EMD SD40 built in 1966.

In 2015, the museum launched a project to recreate the Midget Autopia attraction that had operated in the Walt Disney Municipal Park south of town. The miniature car ride was donated by Disney when the attraction was dismantled at Disneyland. The town operated the ride from 1966 until rising insurance costs and a lack of replacement parts forced its closure in 1977. A single restored car is on display at the museum and was the centerpiece of a Kickstarter project to finance a $500,000 reconstruction of the ride, launched in July 2015. However, 60 days after the launch, the crowdfunding campaign reached its due date, achieving less than 5% of the expected goal. In 2018, the project was still moving and under construction, with a follow-up campaign of continued donations on GoFundMe.

== See also ==
- Rail transport in Walt Disney Parks and Resorts
