= Raymond Watson =

President of the Irvine Company (1926–2012)

- Born: Raymond L. Watson; October 4, 1926; Seattle, Washington, U.S.
- Died: October 20, 2012 (aged 86); Newport Beach, California, U.S.
- Education: University of California, Berkeley (A.B, M.A.)
- Occupation: Businessman
- Years active: 1960–2004
- Title: Chairman of The Walt Disney Company (1983–1984)
- Term: 1983 – 1984
- Spouse: Elsa Watson
- Children: 4
- Awards: Disney Legend Award

Raymond "Ray" L. Watson (October 4, 1926 – October 20, 2012) was the former president of the Irvine Company, and served as chief planner during the 1960s and 1970s. He was also chairman of Walt Disney Productions from 1983 to 1984, and served on the Disney board from 1972 until March 2004.

== Early life and education ==
Raymond L. Watson was born in Seattle, Washington on October 4, 1926, to Olive Lorentzon, a Norwegian schoolteacher, and Leslie Watson, a Scots-Irish carpenter. They lived in Greenwood, a low-lying Seattle suburb. While celebrating his sister Doris's third birthday, his mother suffered a stroke and fell into a coma, dying three months later aged 33. Her death and the Great Depression created a "period of instability" within the Watson family as they became dependent on relatives while his father looked for work, eventually getting a job constructing state park buildings in Oakland, California. After moving to Oakland in 1934, Watson was raised by his grandmother, spending his summers at the state beaches and parks where his father worked as a carpenter. After a short stint in the U.S. Army Air Corps Cadet Training Program toward the end of World War II, he enrolled at the University of California, Berkeley, receiving his B.A. in 1951 and a master's degree in 1953, both in architecture.

== Business career ==
Watson was hired in 1960 as chief planner of the Irvine Company. During his time at the Irvine Company, Watson oversaw development of the City of Irvine; the University of California, Irvine; Newport Center; and Fashion Island as well as numerous residential villages throughout Orange County.

In a 1996 essay in the Orange County Register, Watson wrote of his development and planning work in Irvine: “Irvine the community, the town, the city, is what you, the citizens of Irvine, have built. You've built an outstanding education system within the walls of the school buildings. You've created and run an outstanding recreation program that used the open space, parks and lakes (William) Pereira visualized and we built. You bring life and therefore community to the shopping and entertainment centers we've built. The Irvine villages we conceived are now your communities, home to your homes."

== Awards and honors ==
A pedestrian bridge was named in Watson’s honor in 2005 (Watson Bridge). An inscription at the site credits Watson as a “Modern Renaissance Man.” This bridge is owned by the City of Irvine, and connects the University of California, Irvine to the Irvine Company's University Center.

In 2006, Raymond Watson was awarded The Medal by the University of California, Irvine.

Watson is a former trustee of the University of California, Irvine Foundation and a former member of The Paul Merage School of Business Dean's Advisory Board. Watson was chair of the Daniel G. Aldrich Society and in 1997, was honored with the Center for Real Estate Lifetime Achievement Award.

He was also elected a Fellow of the American Institute of Architects in 1971; served as University of California Regent’s Professor in the Graduate School of Management at UCI; received the California Council’s 1986 Award for Excellence in Architects in Industry, and was elected to the California Building Industry’s Hall of Fame in 1988.

== Personal life ==
Watson and his wife, Elsa, lived in the same Newport Beach home for 48 years, in the East Bluff development that he helped plan. They were lifetime members of the University of California, Irvine Chancellor's Club.

Business positions
Preceded by Card Walker	Disney Chairmen; 1983–84	Succeeded by Michael Eisner
