= La Plata (disambiguation) =

La Plata (Spanish for "the silver") can refer to:

== Places ==
=== Argentina ===
- La Plata, capital and largest city of Buenos Aires Province
  - La Plata station, the principal railway station and central transport hub
  - La Plata Partido, a district in Buenos Aires Province
  - La Plata Museum
  - Universidad Nacional de La Plata
  - La Plata Astronomical Observatory
- Mar del Plata, 2nd largest city in Buenos Aires Province
- United Provinces of the Río de la Plata
- Viceroyalty of the Río de la Plata

=== Bolivia ===
- Ciudad de la Plata de la Nueva Toledo, old name for Sucre, Bolivia

=== Colombia ===
- La Plata, Huila, a municipality in Colombia

=== Spain ===
- La Plata (Seville Metro), a railway station

=== United States ===
- La Plata, Maryland
- La Plata, Missouri
  - La Plata (Amtrak station)
- La Plata, Utah, ghost town
- La Plata County, Colorado
  - Durango-La Plata County Airport
- La Plata Mountains, Colorado
- La Plata Peak, Colorado

== Rivers ==
- Río de la Plata (also: River Plate), in South America
  - Rio de la Plata Basin, that flows towards the river
- Rio de la Plata (Puerto Rico), in Puerto Rico
- La Plata River (San Juan River), in the United States

== Other ==
- La Plata dolphin, found in coastal Atlantic waters of southeastern South America
- Battle of La Plata, in Cuba
- La Plata FC, football club from Argentina
- 1029 La Plata, asteroid
- La Plata, a restaurant in the comic Brunilda à La Plata
