= Fort Madison station (1968–2021) =

Fort Madison, IA
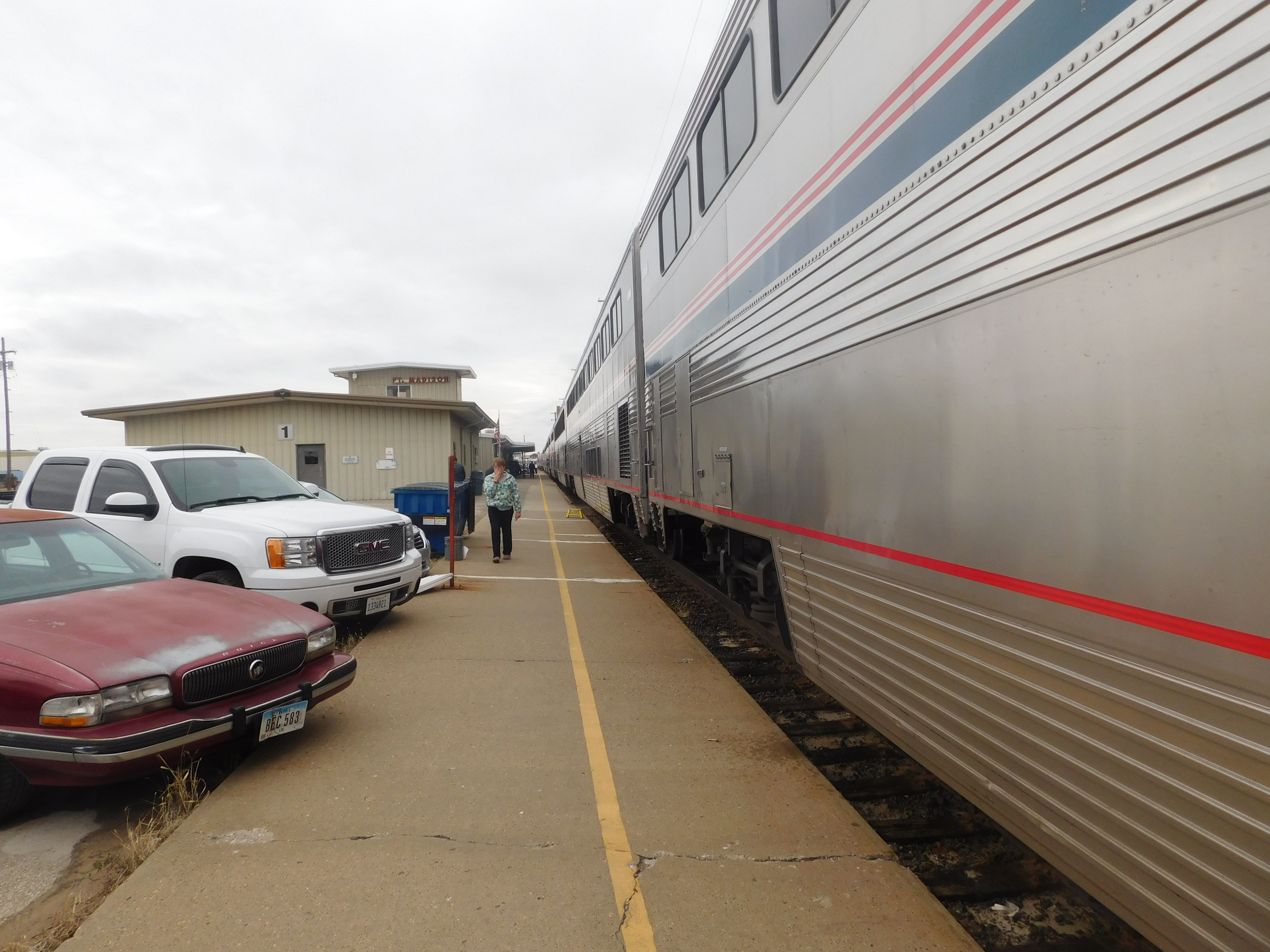
- The Southwest Chief at Fort Madison station in October 2015

General information
- Location: 1601 20th Street, Fort Madison, Iowa 52627
- Coordinates: 40.6223°N 91.3375°W
- Owner: BNSF Railway
- Line: BNSF Railway Chillicothe / Marceline Subdivisions
- Platforms: 1 side platform, 1 island platform
- Tracks: 2

Other information
- Station code: FMD

History
- Opened: 1968
- Closed: December 15, 2021

Passengers
- 2017: 6,661 ▲0.76%

Former services
Preceding station	Amtrak	Following station
La Plata toward Los Angeles	Southwest Chief	Galesburg toward Chicago
La Plata toward Dallas or Houston	Lone Star	Galesburg (SF Depot) toward Chicago
Preceding station	Atchison, Topeka and Santa Fe Railway	Following station
Gibbs toward Los Angeles	Main Line	Fort Madison toward Chicago
Location

Fort Madison was an Amtrak train station in Fort Madison, Iowa, United States. The former Amtrak station was built in 1968 by the Atchison, Topeka and Santa Fe Railway—commonly referred to as the "Santa Fe." Located at the east end of a Burlington Northern Santa Fe Railway (BNSF—successor to the Santa Fe) freight yard, it was about a half hour walk away from downtown. It replaced a downtown Santa Fe complex that included a 1910 depot, Railway Express Agency (REA) building, and freight office.

On December 15, 2021, Amtrak moved its operations back to the historic Santa Fe Depot, located directly in downtown Fort Madison.

== Original station restoration ==
The city, in collaboration with BNSF, Amtrak, the Iowa Department of Transportation, the Southeast Iowa Regional Planning Commission, and the North Lee County Historical Society (NLCHS), has worked since 2006 to restore the old Santa Fe station to accommodate an Amtrak waiting room and ticket office as well as exhibition and storage space for the NLCHS museum, which moved into the old depot in 1972. Unfortunately, the depot remained susceptible to high water and was flooded several times in the late 20th century. Eventually, the city decided to sponsor a project to lift the depot off of its foundation, construct a new five foot high concrete base, and lower the building back into place; this work occurred during 2011.

The total cost of the depot raising and restoration project is estimated at $3.2 million, and the city obtained funds from a diverse array of grant programs, including $1.5 million through the Federal Highway Administration's Transportation Enhancements program and $1.13 million through I-Jobs, a state investment program designed to renew Iowa's infrastructure, promote long-term economic growth, and help create and retain jobs. Once the renovation was completed, Amtrak moved the Fort Madison stop to the depot, which also continues to house the NLCHS museum.
