= Roy E. Disney =

American businessman and media executive (1930–2009)

Roy E. Disney KCSG
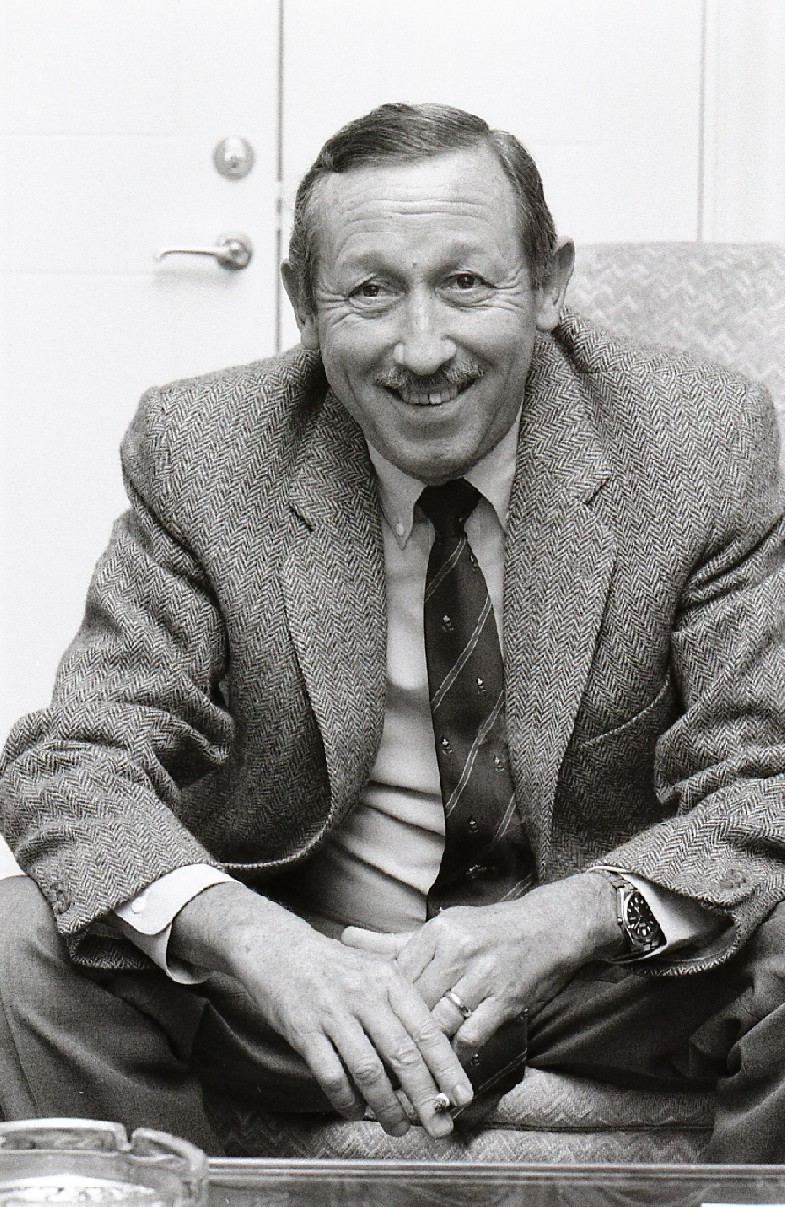
- Disney in 1990
- Born: Roy Edward Disney; January 10, 1930; Los Angeles, California, U.S.
- Died: December 16, 2009 (aged 79); Newport Beach, California, U.S.
- Education: Pomona College
- Occupations: Businessman; media executive; filmmaker; yachtsman
- Years active: 1951–2009
- Political party: Republican
- Spouses: Patricia Ann Dailey (m. 1955; div. 2007) Leslie DeMeuse (m. 2008)
- Children: 4, including Abigail and Tim
- Father: Roy O. Disney
- Relatives: Disney family
- Awards: Annie Award (1993); Disney Legend Award (1998); Lifetime Achievement Award in Animation (2002)

Roy Edward Disney (January 10, 1930 – December 16, 2009) was an American businessman, media executive, and filmmaker. He was best known for serving as a senior executive for the Walt Disney Company and the chairman of its animation division, both of which were founded by his uncle, Walt Disney, and his father, Roy O. Disney.

Born in Los Angeles, Disney graduated from Pomona College in 1951 and began working at Walt Disney Productions as an assistant director and producer. He then resigned at the company as an executive, and during his tenure he organized ousting of the company's top two executives: Ron W. Miller in 1984 and Michael Eisner in 2005. At the time of his death, he held more than 16 million shares (about 1% of the company), and served as a consultant for the company, as well as director emeritus for the board of directors.

As the last member of the Disney family to be actively involved in the company, Disney was often compared to his uncle and to his father. In 2006, Forbes magazine estimated his personal fortune at $1.2 billion.

Disney was also a celebrated yachtsman, a member of San Diego Yacht Club best known for his success in the Transpacific Yacht Race and winning the Newport Bermuda Race. Disney died from stomach cancer at the age of 79 on December 16, 2009, after battling the disease for over a year.

== Biography ==
=== Early life, education, and career beginnings ===
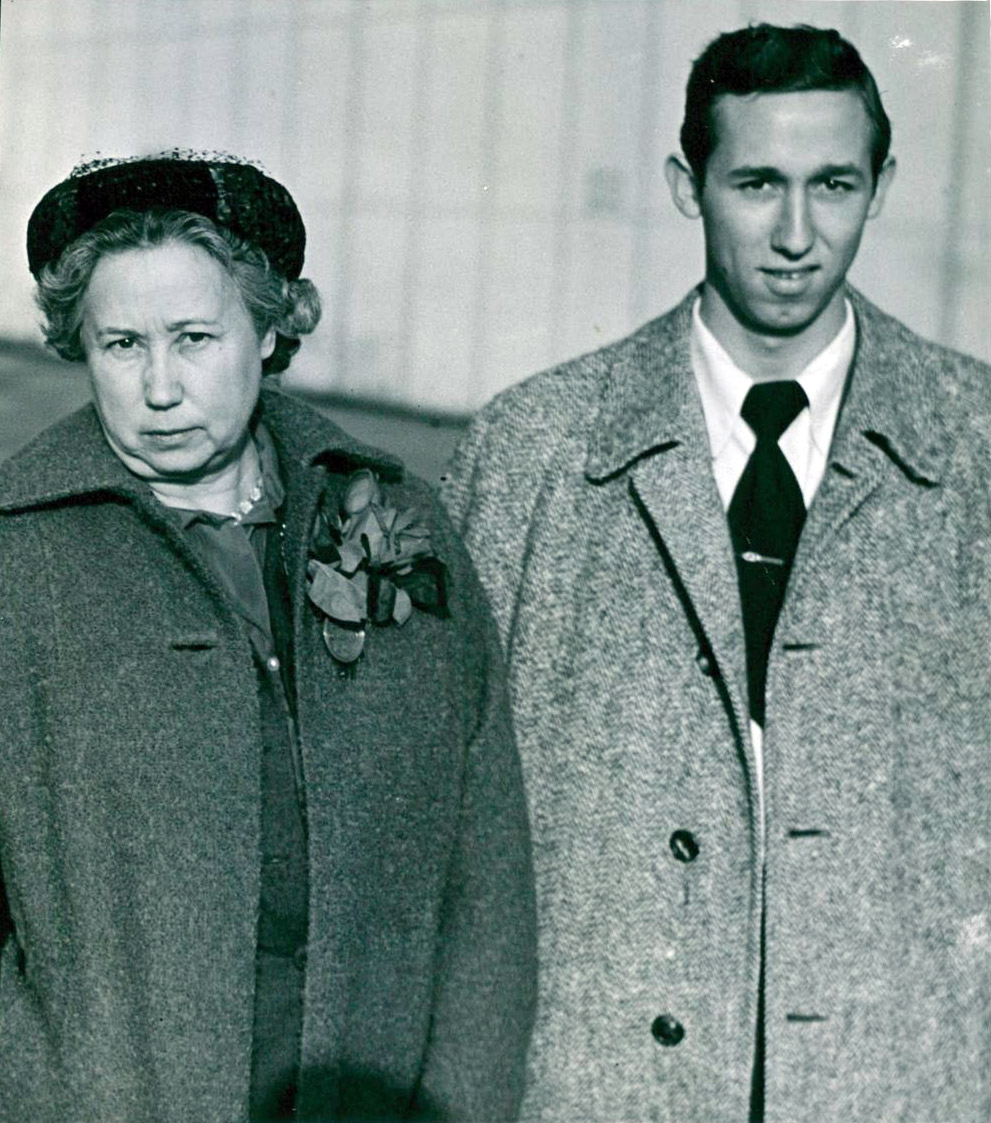
Disney (right) with his mother Edna Francis Disney at Bromma Airport in 1951

Disney was born in Los Angeles, California, the only child of Edna (née Francis; 1890–1984) and Roy O. Disney (1893–1971), the brother of Walt Disney. He graduated from Pomona College in 1951 and first began working for Walt Disney Productions as an assistant director and producer (True-Life Adventures). He continued until 1967, when he was elected to the company's board of directors.

=== First "Save Disney" campaign (1984) ===
Disney resigned as an executive from Walt Disney Productions in 1977 over disagreements with corporate decisions. He later said, "I just felt creatively the company was not going anywhere interesting. It was very stifling."

Disney retained a seat on the board of directors until 1984, when he resigned in the midst of a corporate takeover battle. This began a series of events that ultimately led to the replacement of Ron Miller (husband of Walt's daughter Diane Marie Disney) by Frank Wells and Michael Eisner as president and CEO, respectively. While investors were attempting the hostile takeover of Disney with the intention of dismantling the company and selling off its assets, Disney and his attorney and financial advisor Stanley Gold organized a consortium of white knight investors to fend off the takeover attempts. With the introduction of Wells and Eisner, Roy returned to the company as vice chairman and chairman of the animation department, which became Walt Disney Feature Animation.

=== Partnership with Eisner ===
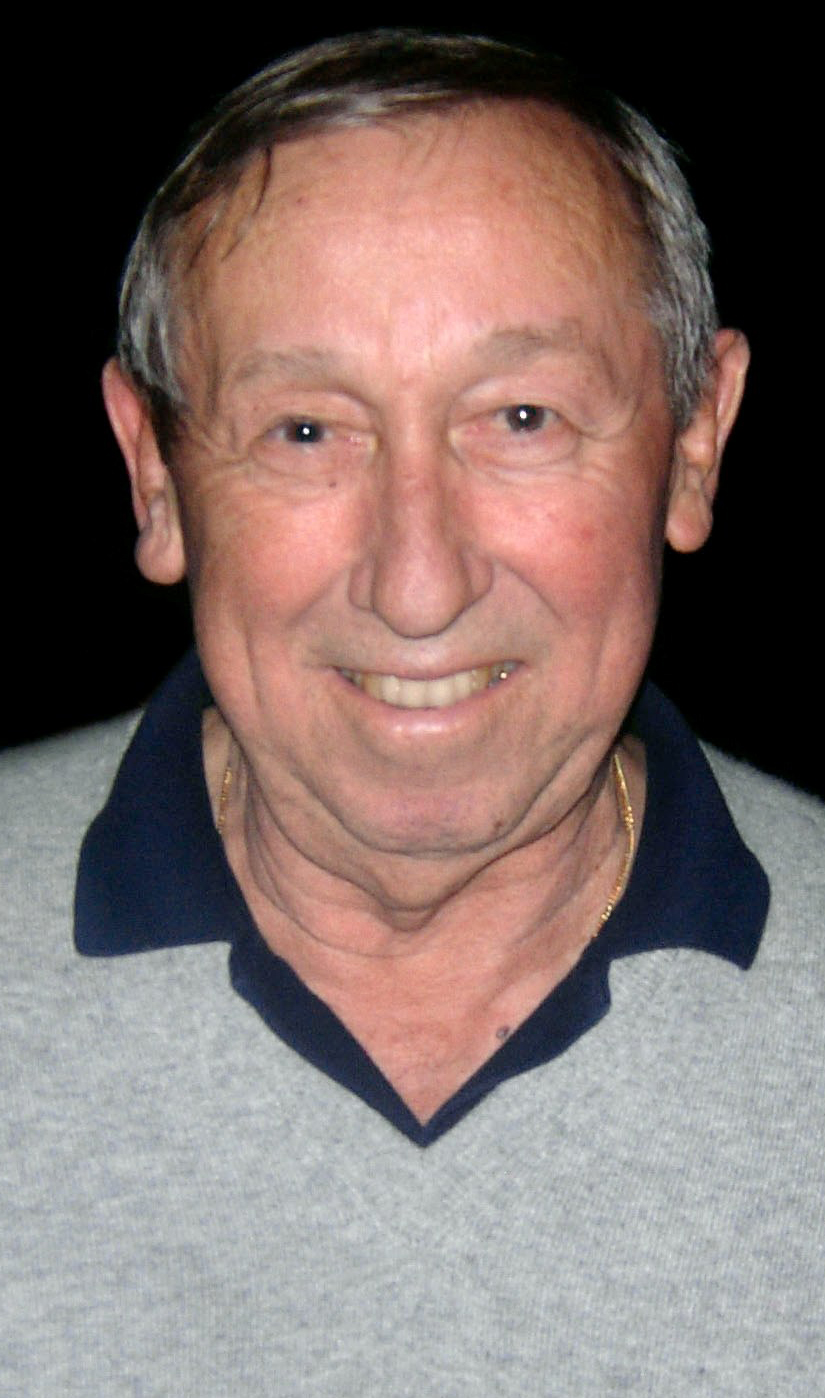
Disney in 2007

During the late 1980s and throughout the 1990s, Disney's department produced a number of commercially successful and critically acclaimed films, an era which has been called the "Disney Renaissance". The Lion King, for instance, garnered nearly $1 billion following its release in the summer of 1994 and was the second-highest-grossing film of the year. Despite this, Disney experienced a marked decline in profits beginning in the late 1990s as it expanded into lower-grossing, though still profitable direct-to-video spin-offs and sequels.

Disney was concerned about Jeffrey Katzenberg taking too much credit for the success of Disney's early 1990s releases. When Frank Wells died in a helicopter crash in 1994, Michael Eisner refused to promote Katzenberg to the vacated position of president. Eisner recalled, "Roy [Walt Disney's nephew and a force on Disney's board who Eisner says "could be a troublemaker"], who did not like him at all — I forget the reason, but Jeffrey probably did not treat him the way that Roy would have wanted to be treated — said to me, 'If you make him the president, I will start a proxy fight.'" Tensions between Katzenberg, Eisner and Disney resulted in Katzenberg's resignation from the company that October. Katzenberg launched a lawsuit against Disney to recover money he felt he was owed and settled out of court for an estimated $250 million.

On October 16, 1998, in a surprise presentation made at the newly unveiled Disney Legends Plaza at the company's headquarters, Eisner presented Disney with the Disney Legends Award. Disney's pet project was the film Fantasia 2000, a sequel to his uncle's 1940 animated movie Fantasia. Walt Disney had planned a sequel to the original movie, but it was not finally released until December 17, 1999, after nine years of production under Disney. Like its predecessor, the film combined high-quality contemporary animation and classical music, but also suffered at the US box office.

=== Second "Save Disney" campaign (2003–2005) ===
After relations with Eisner began to sour, Disney's influence began to wane as important executive posts were filled by those friendly to Eisner. When the board of directors rejected Disney's request for an extension of his term as a member, he announced his resignation on November 30, 2003, citing "serious differences of opinion about the direction and style of management" in the company. He issued a letter criticizing Eisner's alleged mismanagement, neglect of the studio's animation division, failures with ABC, timidity in the theme-park business, corporate mentality in the executive structure turning the Walt Disney Company into a "rapacious, soul-less" conglomerate, and refusal to establish a clear succession plan.

After his resignation, Disney helped establish the website SaveDisney.com, intended to oust Michael Eisner and his supporters from their positions and revamp the Walt Disney Company. On March 3, 2004, at the company's annual shareholders' meeting, a surprising 43% of shareholders, predominantly rallied by Disney and fellow former board member Stanley Gold, voted to oppose the re-election of Eisner to the corporate board of directors. This vigorous opposition, unusual in major public corporations, persuaded the board to replace Eisner as chairman with George J. Mitchell; he did, however, remain as chief executive. This "Save Disney" campaign regarded Mitchell himself unfavorably, and in the same election, 25% of shareholders opposed Mitchell's re-election to the board.

As criticism of Eisner intensified in the wake of the shareholder meeting, his position became increasingly tenuous, culminating on March 13, 2005, with the announcement of Eisner's resignation as CEO effective September 30, one year before his contract would expire. On July 8, Roy and the Walt Disney Company agreed to "put aside their differences." Roy rejoined the board as a nonvoting director emeritus and consultant. Roy and Gold consequently shut down their SaveDisney.com website effective August 7 that year.

As announced, on September 30, Eisner resigned as both chief executive and a member of the board. Severing all formal ties with the company, he waived his contractual rights to perks such as use of a corporate jet, a Gold Pass, and an office at the company's Burbank headquarters. Bob Iger, Eisner's long-time lieutenant who had been effectively running the company, now assumed the title of CEO. One of Roy Disney's stated reasons for engineering his second "Save Disney" initiative had been Eisner's well-publicized disputes with long-time production partner Pixar Animation Studios and its CEO Steve Jobs, with whom Disney had produced such animated hits as Toy Story, Monsters, Inc., and Finding Nemo, which were critically acclaimed and financially successful for both partners. Iger quickly repaired the estrangement, and on January 24, 2006, the company announced the acquisition of Pixar in an all-stock deal worth $7.4 billion. This deal made Jobs, best known as co-founder and CEO of Apple, Inc, Disney's largest shareholder with 7% of all outstanding shares and gave him a new seat on Disney's board of directors. Eisner, who retained 1.7% of shares, became Disney's second-largest shareholder, followed by Roy Disney, with 1% of shares. Disney's second "Save Disney" campaign against Eisner was chronicled by James B. Stewart in his best-selling book DisneyWar.

=== Other work ===
- Disney was a trustee of the California Institute of the Arts, another institution founded by his uncle Walt.
- He appeared as himself in a voice cameo in an episode of the animated show Mickey Mouse Works (later shown on House of Mouse) in which Mickey accidentally sent him an angry fax meant for Mortimer Mouse.
- In 1998, he executive produced The Wonderful Ice Cream Suit, written by Ray Bradbury and directed by Stuart Gordon.
- Shamrock Holdings, which Disney owned and Stanley Gold ran as CEO, is an investment company which managed Disney's personal investments.

== Personal life and death ==
Disney held several sailing speed records, including the Los Angeles to Honolulu monohull time record. He set it on his boat Pyewacket in July 1999 (7 days, 11 hours, 41 minutes, 27 seconds).

On January 19, 2007, after beginning a relationship with Leslie DeMeuse, Disney (then 77 years old) filed for divorce from his wife, Patricia (then 72), citing "irreconcilable differences", according to court documents. The couple, married for 52 years, had been living apart, according to the Los Angeles County Superior Court filing. They had four adult children: Abigail Disney, Susan Disney Lord, Tim Disney (a documentary film producer), and Roy Patrick Disney (step-father of actor and activist Charlee Corra).

In 2008, Disney married DeMeuse, a CSTV producer, and Emmy winner of various sailing documentaries.

Disney died of stomach cancer on December 16, 2009, at Hoag Memorial Hospital in Newport Beach, California. He was 79 years old, and had been battling the disease for over a year. He was cremated after his funeral service, and his ashes were scattered into the Pacific Ocean.

== Honours and legacy ==
On January 4, 1998, Pope John Paul II made Disney a Knight Commander of the Pontifical Order of St. Gregory the Great.

On January 1, 2000, Disney participated as the grand marshal of the 111th Rose Parade.

On April 26, 2008, Disney received an honorary doctorate from the California Maritime Academy "for his many contributions to the state and the nation, including international sailing."

The animation studio building at the Walt Disney Studios, in Burbank, California, was rededicated as the Roy E. Disney Animation Building on May 7, 2010.

In 2010, the Waikiki Yacht Club and the Hawaii Youth Sailing Association created the Roy E. Disney Youth Sailor of the Year perpetual trophy in honor of their longtime member. The award features a half-hull of the TP 52 yacht Morning Light used in the documentary film of the same name produced by Disney of a crew made up entirely of young sailors competing in the 44th Transpacific Yacht Race from Los Angeles to Honolulu.

== See also ==
- Walt Disney (2015 PBS film)
