= Atchison, Topeka and Santa Fe Passenger and Freight Complex Historic District =

Historic district in Iowa, United States

Fort Madison, IA
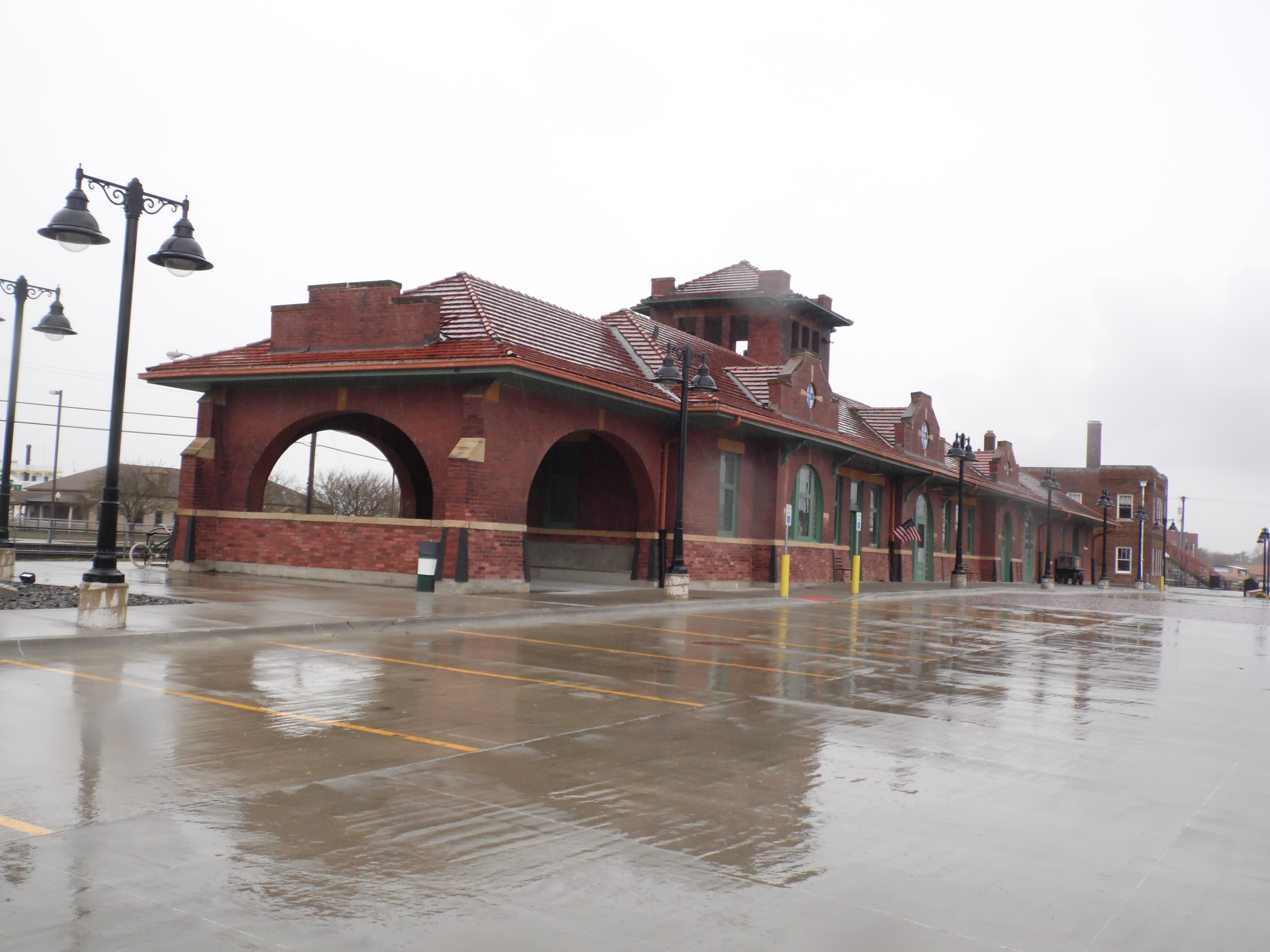
- The Atchison, Topeka and Santa Fe Passenger and Freight Complex in Fort Madison, Iowa. Currently home to the North Lee County Historical society.

General information
- Location: 902 Avenue H Fort Madison, Iowa
- Coordinates: 40°37′46.2″N 91°18′49″W
- Owner: BNSF Railway
- Line: BNSF Chillicothe / Marceline Subdivisions
- Platforms: 1 side platform
- Tracks: 2

Other information
- Station code: Amtrak: FMD

History
- Opened: 1910
- Closed: 1968
- Rebuilt: December 15, 2021

Passengers
- FY 2025: 5,940 (Amtrak)

Services
Preceding station	Amtrak	Following station
La Plata toward Los Angeles	Southwest Chief	Galesburg toward Chicago
Former services
Preceding station	Atchison, Topeka and Santa Fe Railway	Following station
Shopton toward Los Angeles	Main Line	East Fort Madison toward Chicago
Services at Adjacent CB&Q station
Preceding station	Burlington Route	Following station
Wever toward Burlington	Burlington – St. Louis	Viele toward St. Louis
Wever toward Burlington	Burlington – Laclede	Viele toward Laclede
Sawyer toward Birmingham	Birmingham – Fort Madison	Terminus
- Atchison, Topeka and Santa Fe Passenger and Freight Complex
- U.S. National Register of Historic Places
- U.S. Historic district
- Interactive map of Atchison, Topeka and Santa Fe Passenger and Freight Complex
- Location: 902 Avenue H Fort Madison, Iowa
- Area: less than one acre
- Built: 1910, 1926, 1934
- Built by: Allen Smith
- Architect: C.F. Morse; J.M. Dunham
- Architectural style: Mission/Spanish Revival
- MPS: Advent & Development of Railroads in Iowa MPS
- NRHP reference No.: 92000100
- Added to NRHP: March 5, 1992
Location

The Atchison, Topeka and Santa Fe Passenger and Freight Complex is a nationally recognized historic district located in Fort Madison, Iowa, United States. It was listed on the National Register of Historic Places in 1992. At the time of its nomination it contained three resources, all of which are contributing buildings. The buildings were constructed over a 24-year time period, and reflect the styles that were popular when built. The facility currently houses a local history museum, and after renovations a portion of it was converted back to a passenger train depot for Amtrak, which opened on December 15, 2021.

== Description ==
The historic district consists of a former passenger depot (1910) and a former freight station (1934) built by the Atchison, Topeka and Santa Fe Railway. They replaced an earlier frame passenger depot that was built in 1888 and later expanded to include the freight office. Fort Madison had become a division and crew change point for Santa Fe routes, and it had a locomotive repair shop and other facilities in town, so an upgraded depot was seen as a necessity. This was the railroad's only stop in Iowa. It also includes the Railway Express Agency's (REA) Express Office, completed in 1922. The station closed in 1968 and replaced by the Amtrak station until service moved back in 2021.

== Architecture ==
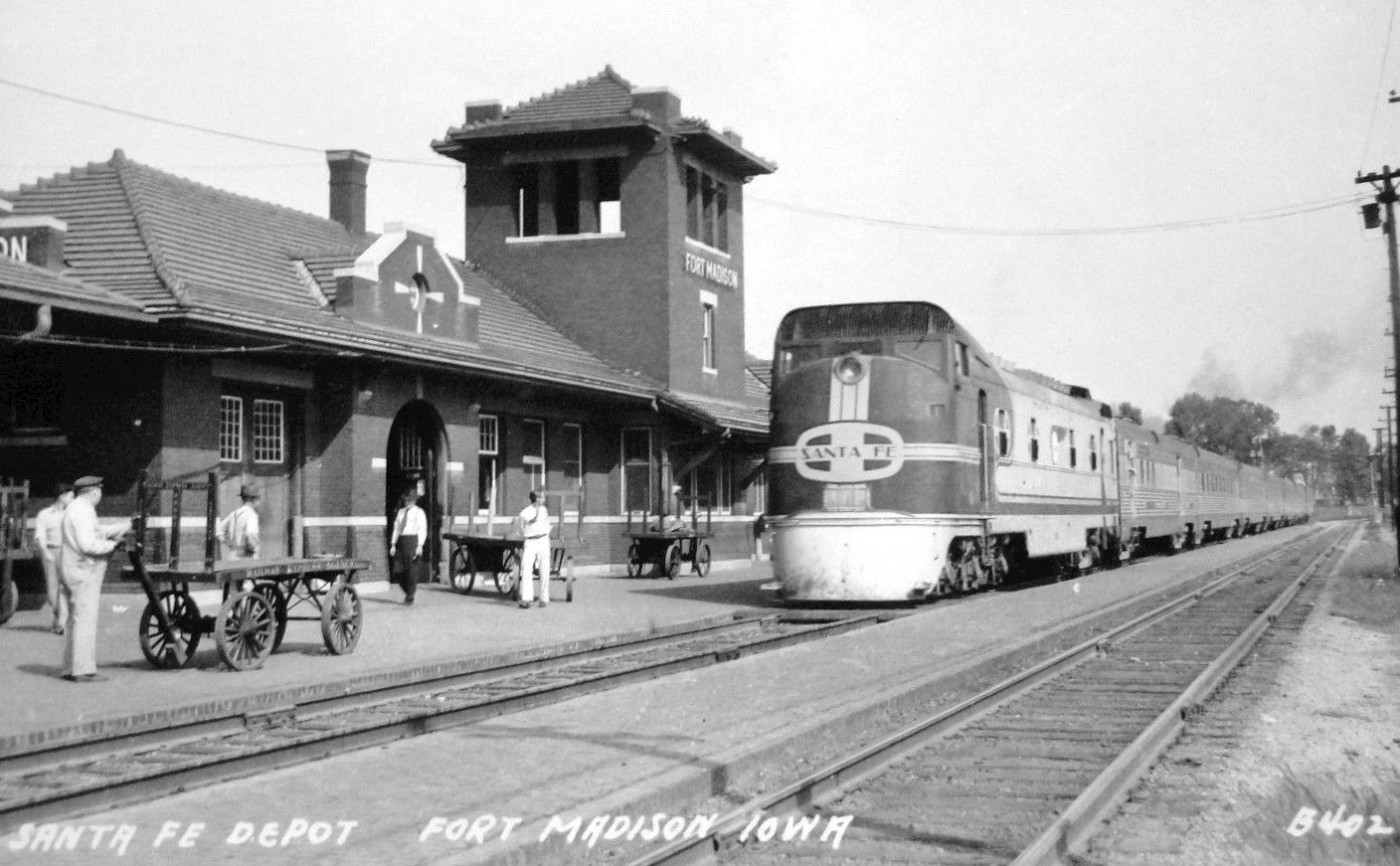
Postcard image of the depot c. 1941

Both the passenger depot and the Railway Express Office were designed in the Mission Revival style, however, they were designed separately by different individuals. The depot was designed as a combination passenger and freight station by C.F. Morse, Chief Engineer for the Santa Fe. It is an adaptation of the brick depot standard they called the "county-seat." The depot is a single-story structure and rectangular in shape, that measures 202 by 26 feet (61.6 by 7.9 m). The exterior is composed of pressed brick and its copings, window sills, and water table are of composed of locally quarried Appanoose stone. The building rests on a reinforced concrete foundation and it is capped with a red tile hipped roof. There are three curvilinear roof dormers on the north elevation and two on the south. They each feature the Santa Fe insignia. In the center of the structure is a three-story tower. A 1945 renovation changed the interior to the Art Deco style and removed the women's waiting room.

The Railway Express Office was designed by J. M. Dunham, who was the REA's architect and superintendent of buildings working in their St. Louis office. Adjoining the depot, it too is composed of pressed brick with stone trim, a concrete foundation, and red tile roof. It differed in that it featured copper flashings on the chimney and a copper dormer with louvers on the east and west elevations. The dormers were removed in a 1990 renovation.

The Santa Fe Freight Office was built to the west of the Railway Express Office between January 1931 and December 1934. It is a two-story rectangular brick structure, and it is more utilitarian than Mission Revival in its style. The Santa Fe logo in stone is located in the upper corners of the north and south elevations. A fire in the late 1960s or early 1970s destroyed a wooden frame structure that was attached to the building and was used for loading and unloading freight. As the depot was a crew changing location, the Santa Fe's conductor and brakemen showered and slept in this building.

== Post Santa Fe-era ==
The Santa Fe railroad built a new Fort Madison Station one and a half miles to the south west and moved passenger service there in 1968, leaving the 1910 station empty. They sold the facility to the City of Fort Madison for $1. The railroad removed most of the furnishings. The city leased the buildings to the North Lee County Historical Society (NLCHS) beginning in 1972 for a local history museum. The NLCHS is responsible for routine maintenance of the three buildings. A Santa Fe caboose (1954) is on display on the property, Steam Locomotive 2913 (1944) is located a little farther to the east.

Between 2006 and 2021, the City of Fort Madison, BNSF Railway, Amtrak, the Iowa Department of Transportation, the Southeast Iowa Regional Planning Commission, and the NLCHS worked together to restore the old Santa Fe station and create an Amtrak waiting room and ticket office in addition to museum space. Metzger Johnson Architects of Galesburg, Illinois assisted in the design of the four-phase project. The first phase, completed in 2011, raised the buildings 5 feet (1.5 m) and attach them to the new foundations that are now above the projected 500-year flood elevation. This was necessitated by the complex's location near the Mississippi River and its floods. The second phase raised, graded, and paved the parking lot. The fourth phase was completed at the same time as phase two in 2012 and renovated the interiors to accommodate Amtrak and the museum. The third phase constructed a platform to connect the station with the trains on the rail. The total cost of the project was approximately $4.5 million. The city obtained funding from various grant programs, including $1.5 million through the Federal Highway Administration's Transportation Enhancements program and $1.13 million through I-Jobs, a state economic investment program that is designed to update Iowa's infrastructure and to help create and retain jobs.

== Chicago, Burlington and Quincy Railroad station ==
The former Chicago, Burlington and Quincy (CB&Q) Fort Madison station is located immediately to the north of the Santa Fe complex, but it is not part of the historic district. The station was built in 1898 and currently houses the North Lee County Historical Society Transportation Museum. The station was impacted by flooding in 2019, as the area was not a part of the project to raise the foundation of the former Santa Fe station. The single track is also owned by the BNSF Railway on the Hannibal Subdivision, also known as the "K Line."
