= Disney family =

American family whose second and third generations were filmmakers

Disney Family
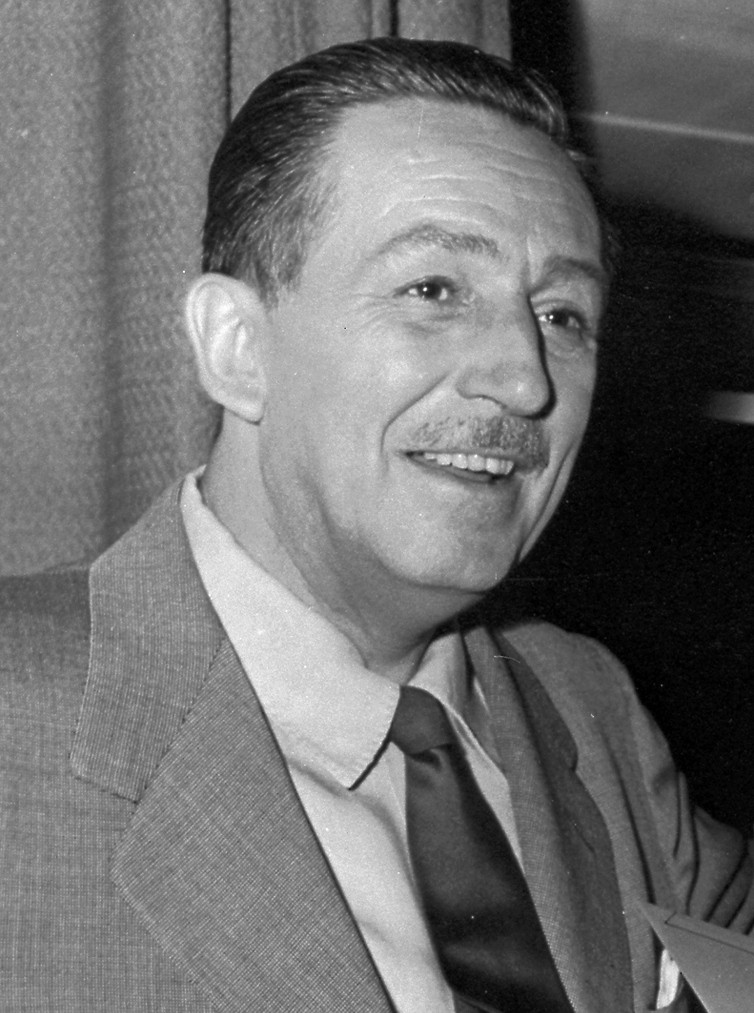
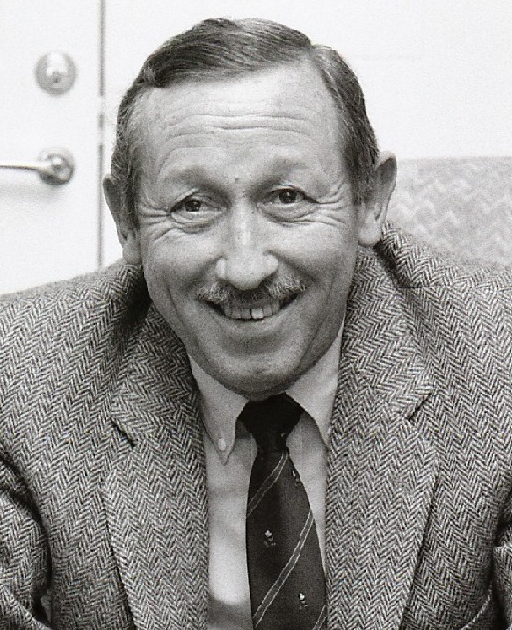
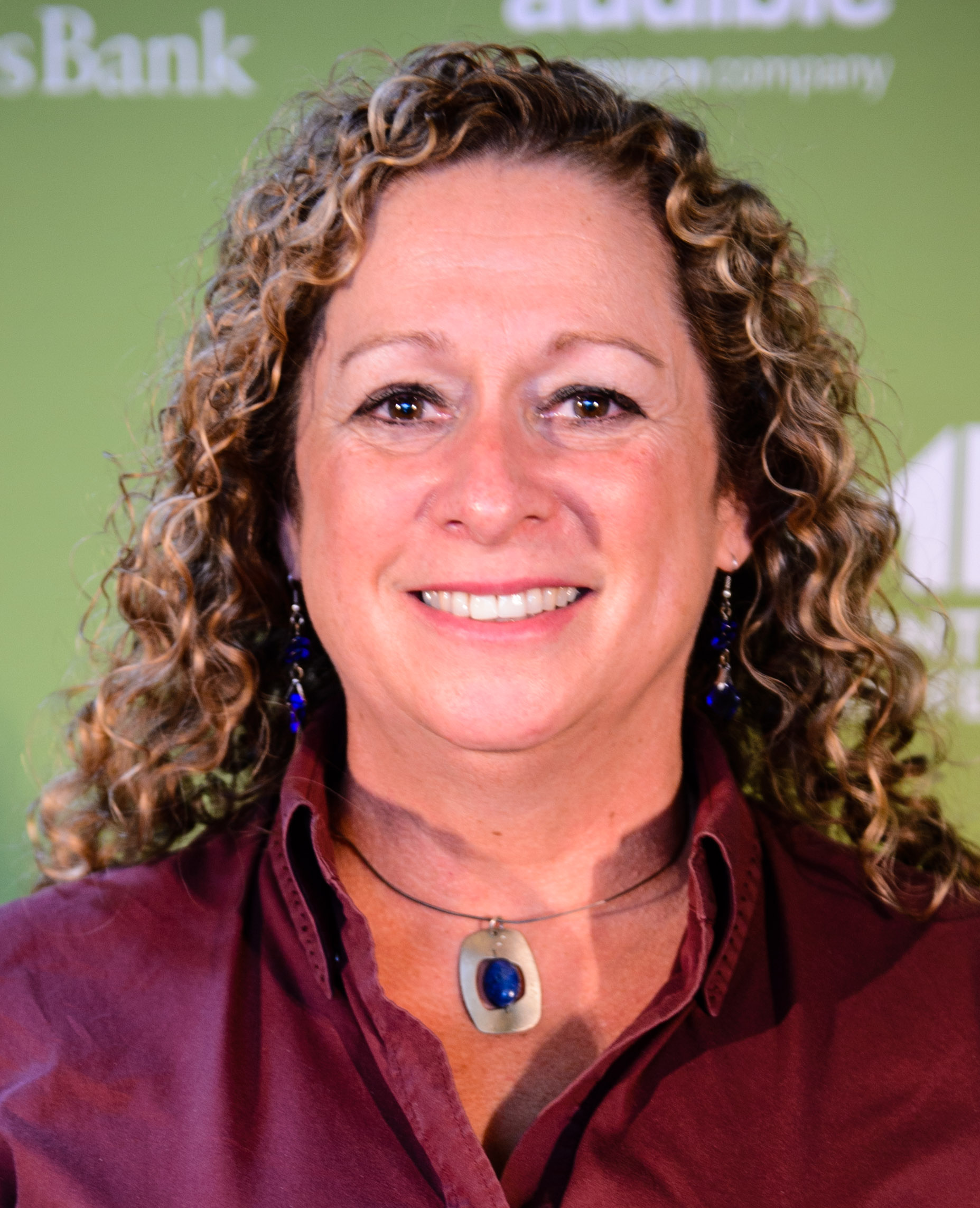
- Walt Disney Roy E. Disney Abigail Disney
- Current region: Southern California, U.S.
- Etymology: Originally "d'Isigny" (transl. from Isigny)
- Origin: Isigny-sur-Mer, France
- Founder: Elias Disney
- Estate: Disney Storybook Mansion

The Disney family is an American family that gained prominence when brothers Roy and Walt began creating films through the Disney Brothers Cartoon Studio, today known as mass media and entertainment conglomerate The Walt Disney Company. The Disney family's influence on American culture grew with successful feature films such as Snow White and the Seven Dwarfs in 1937 and the opening of the Disneyland amusement park in 1955. Other Disney family members have been involved in the management and administration of the Disney company, filmmaking, and philanthropy.

The Disney family is of primarily Anglo-Irish, English and German descent. The Disneys trace its European origin to the 19th century, with Kepple Disney (grandfather of Walt) who left County Kilkenny, Ireland for Liverpool in 1834, settling in the Province of Upper Canada. Walt’s father Elias Disney was the first Canadian-born ancestor, in 1859. The first American-born was Herbert Disney in 1888, Walt’s older brother.

== Family roots ==
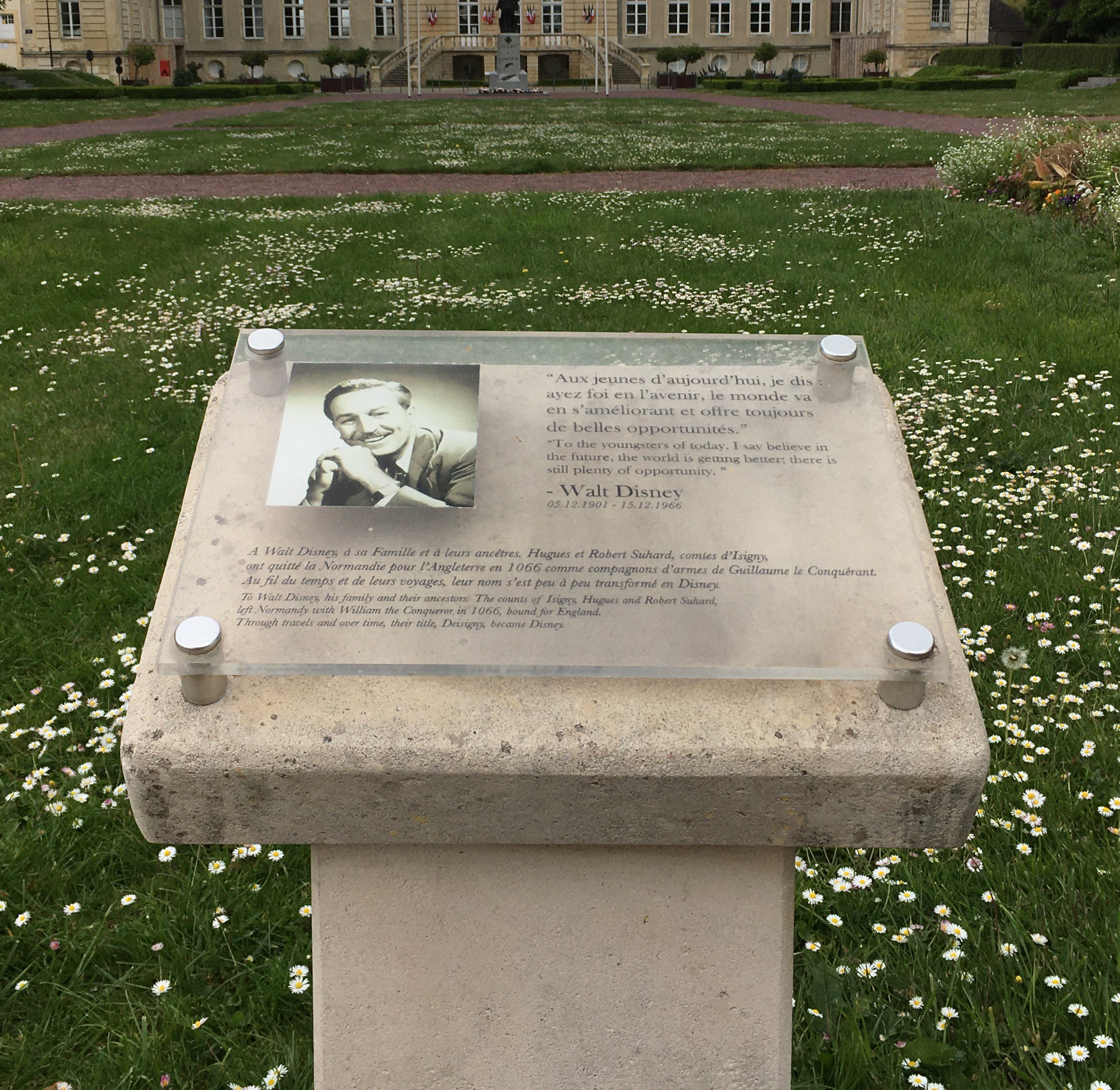
The Walt Disney garden in Isigny-sur-Mer, Normandy is in front of the town hall.

The family name, originally d'Isigny ("from Isigny"), is of Norman French derivation, coming from the town of Isigny-sur-Mer (now in the Calvados department of Normandy, France). Robert d'Isigny, the family's first ancestor in England, was a Norman who had traveled with William the Conqueror in 1066, who among other Anglo-Normans at the time later Anglicized his name to 'Disney', and named the civil parish of Norton Disney in Lincolnshire after him. Some of the Disney family later took part in the Anglo-Norman invasion of Ireland in the 12th century.

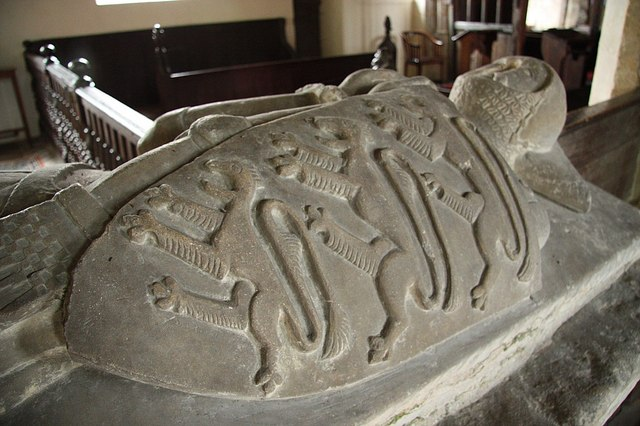
Effigy of Sir William D'Isney in the parish church of Norton Disney, Lincolnshire.

Walt Disney visited the village on the afternoon of Thursday 7 July 1949, in an attempt to trace his ancestry. The visit is recorded in the British magazine Illustrated. Disney had been in the UK from 20 June 1949, arriving at Southampton on RMS Queen Elizabeth; he embarked on a six-day motoring holiday with his two teenage daughters, Diane and Sharon, and his wife, with a convoy of cars. After seeing the village, he left for a night at Boroughbridge in North Yorkshire, later visiting 8 Howard Place in Edinburgh on 8 July. He visited Loch Ness.

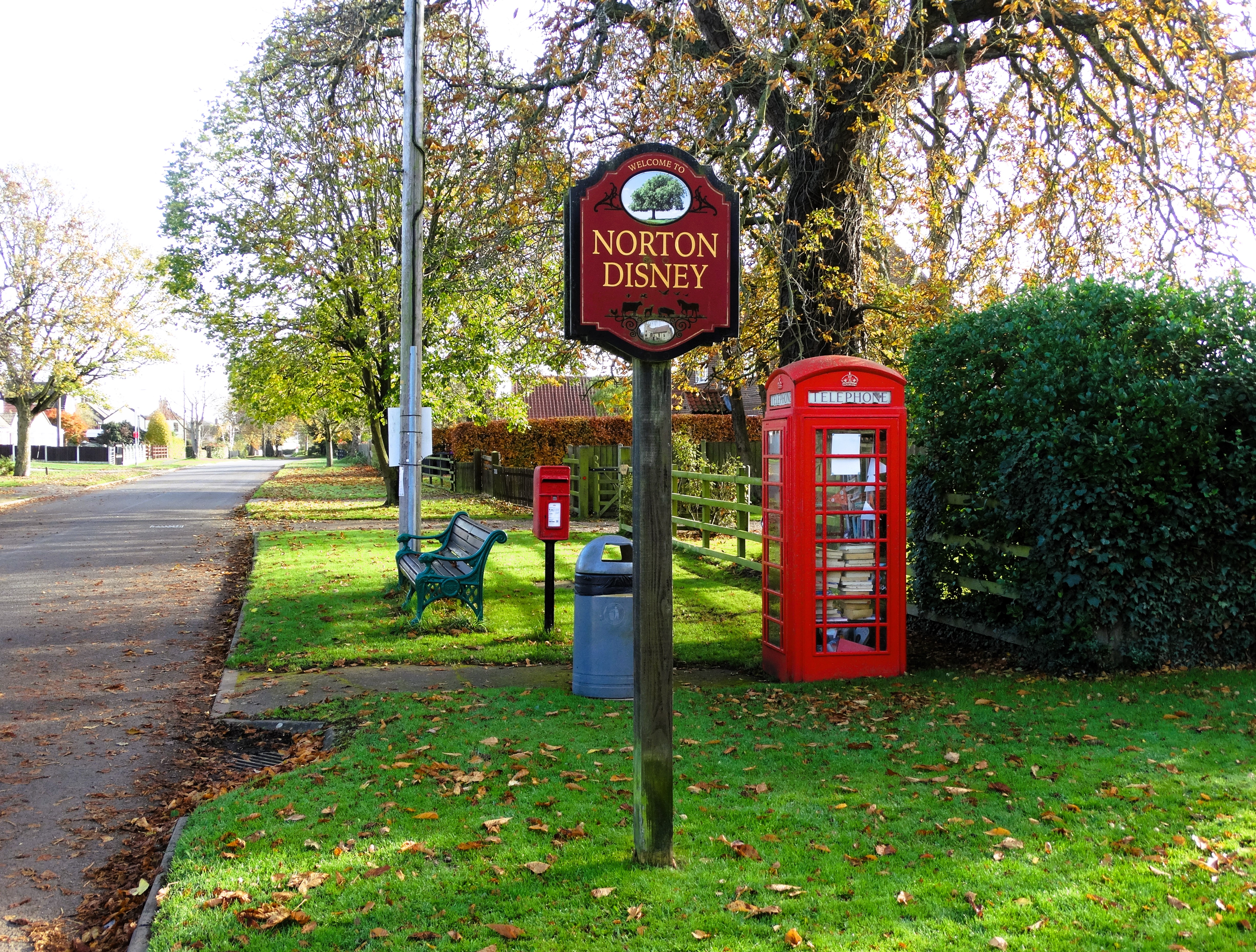
Norton Disney, England. Walt Disney visited the ancestral settlement in 1949.

Disney also planned to visit the Derbyshire Peaks, Stratford-upon-Avon, the Scottish Highlands, and Burns country. Disney spoke to the vicar, Rev R. K. Roper, who said that Disney was a 'charming unaffected person'. Disney's daughters had decided that their father had been working too hard, and needed a rest.

== History in Canada and America ==
=== First generation ===
Kepple Elias Disney (1832–1891) and Mary Disney (née Richardson) (1838–1909) had emigrated from Freshford, County Kilkenny in Ireland to Canada as children, accompanying their parents and were of Anglo-Irish Protestant descent. They initially settled in Goderich Township. They would have nine children with Elias being the first. The couple owned a 100-acre farm in near Bluevale and got into a variety of other business ventures to make money.

=== Second generation ===
Elias Charles Disney (1859–1941) was born in the rural village of Bluevale, Province of Canada (now Ontario, Canada), to immigrants Kepple Elias Disney (1832–1891) and Mary Richardson (1838–1909). Both parents had emigrated from Ireland to Canada as children, accompanying their parents.

Disney married Flora Call (1868–1938) on January 1, 1888, in Kismet, Lake County, Florida. The couple had five children:

- Herbert Arthur Disney, mail carrier (December 8, 1888 – January 29, 1961, aged 72)
- Raymond Arnold Disney, insurance salesman (December 30, 1890 – May 24, 1989, aged 98)
- Roy Oliver Disney (June 24, 1893 – December 20, 1971, aged 78)
- Walter Elias Disney (December 5, 1901 – December 15, 1966, aged 65)
- Ruth Flora (née Disney) Beecher, stenographer, WDHM benefactor, and musician (December 6, 1903 – April 7, 1995, aged 91)

=== Third generation ===
Roy Oliver Disney (June 24, 1893 – December 20, 1971) was an American businessman and co-founder of The Walt Disney Company. Roy was married to Edna Francis from April 1925 until his death. Roy's nephew Charles Elias Disney chose to name his son Charles Roy Disney in Roy's honor.

Their son, Roy Edward Disney (January 10, 1930 – December 16, 2009), was a longtime senior executive for the Walt Disney Company and the last member of the Disney family to be actively involved in the company. Disney was often compared to his uncle and father. He had two sons (one, Tim Disney, a documentary film producer), and two daughters; his daughter Abigail Disney is a documentary filmmaker.

== Walt Disney family ==
Walter Elias Disney (December 5, 1901 – December 15, 1966) was an American entrepreneur, animator, writer, voice actor and film producer who cofounded Disney Brothers Studio with his brother Roy. He received 59 Academy Award nominations, including 22 awards: both totals are records.

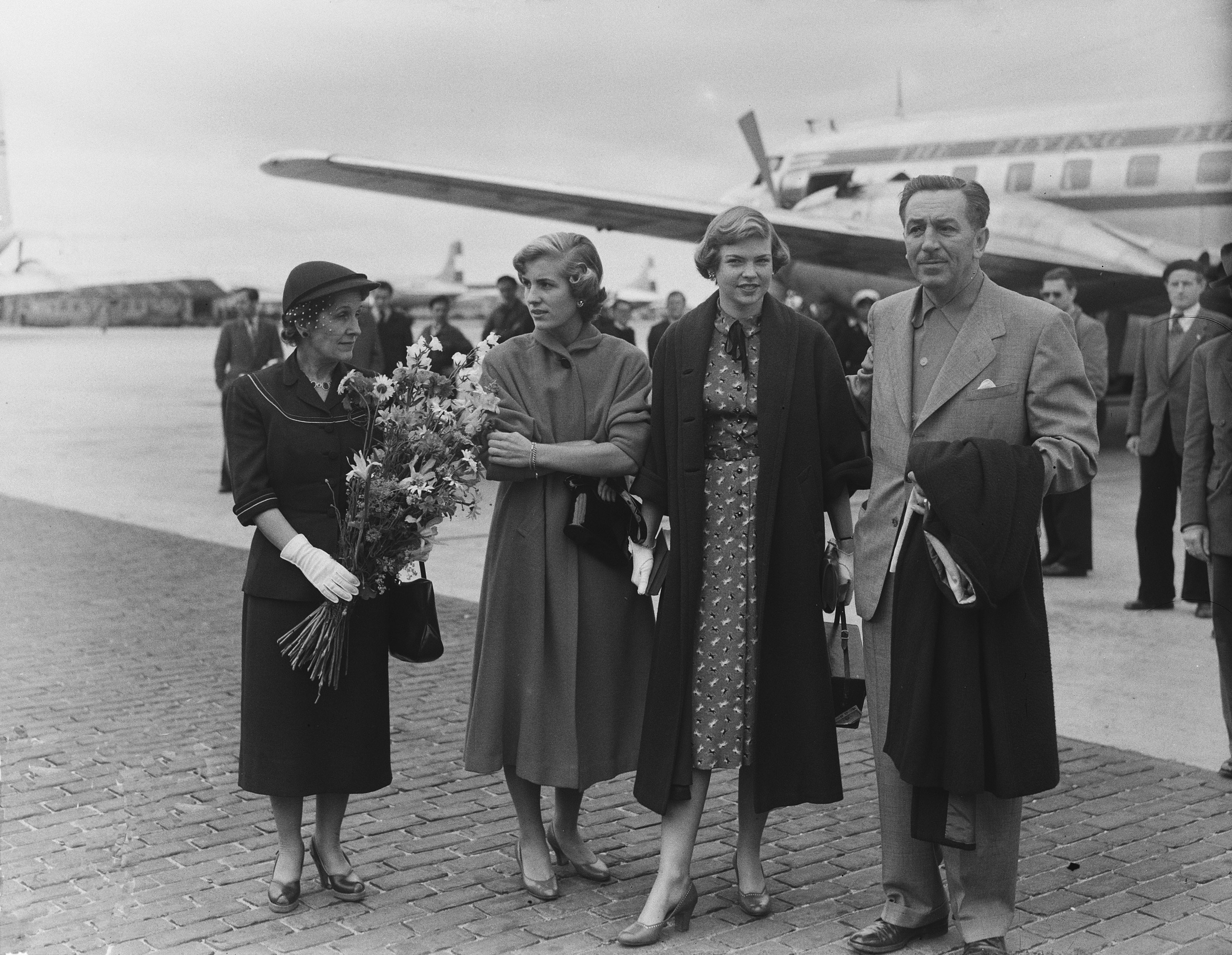
Walt Disney with wife Lillian and daughters Sharon and Diane in 1951.

He married Lillian Bounds in 1925. They had two daughters, bearing Diane (December 18, 1933 – November 19, 2013) and after, reportedly, suffering several miscarriages, adopting Sharon (in December 1936, born six weeks previously – February 16, 1993).

Diane married Ronald William Miller, who became president of Walt Disney Productions in 1980 and CEO in 1983, before being ousted by Roy E. Disney.

Sharon, who became an actress, had three children from two marriages, to Robert Brown and later, to William Lund, and died, of complications of breast cancer, February 16, 1993.

== Legacy ==
In 2001, the Walt Disney Hometown Museum, housing a collection of memorabilia from the Disney family, many of which were donated by the family of Ruth Flora Disney Beecher, Walt's sister, opened, in the restored Santa Fe Railway Depot in Marceline, Missouri.

In 2009, the Walt Disney Family Museum, designed by Disney's daughter Diane and her son (Walt's grandson) Walter E. D. Miller, opened in the Presidio of San Francisco. The museum was established to promote and inspire creativity and innovation and celebrate and study the life of Walt Disney.

Elias Disney moved to Chicago to work on the 1893 World's Fair with his brother Robert. He purchased the property at 2156 N. Tripp Avenue in Chicago on October 31, 1891 and then worked to build a small home, which was ready by 1893 for his family including his wife and two sons, Herbert and Raymond. Roy was born on June 24, 1893 and Walter was born here on December 5, 1901. The family lived in the home until they sold it in 1903 when they moved to Missouri. The home is now being restored to create the Walt Disney Birthplace and the Center for Early Childhood Creativity and Innovation and is open for public tours on the last Saturday of every month.
