= La Plata station =

La Plata station may refer to:

- La Plata station (Missouri), an Amtrak station in La Plata, Missouri, United States
- La Plata station (Argentina), a Roca Line station in La Plata, Buenos Aires, Argentina
- La Plata (Seville Metro), a Line 1 station in Seville, Andalusia, Spain

== See also ==
- La Plata (disambiguation)
