= Golden Pass (Disney) =

Disney theme park ticket

The Golden Pass is a ticket which allows the holder lifetime access to all nine of the theme parks owned and operated by The Walt Disney Company. First awarded in 1955 to Dave MacPherson, the first member of the public to become a paying guest at Disneyland, the Pass is awarded to all Disney Legends and has been handed to dignitaries, the President of the United States and sitting heads of state, and all members of the board of directors.

== Accepting locations ==
The Pass is valid at the following parks:

=== Disneyland Resort ===
1. Disneyland
2. California Adventure

=== Walt Disney World Resort ===
1. Magic Kingdom
2. Epcot
3. Hollywood Studios
4. Animal Kingdom

=== Paris Disney Resort ===
1. Disneyland Paris
2. Walt Disney Studios Paris

=== Hong Kong Disneyland Resort ===
1. Hong Kong Disneyland

When Passes were renewed at the start of 2005, the Hong Kong Disneyland Resort was still under construction and it was noted on the Pass that it would not be valid for entry. This was changed in 2006. The two parks at the Tokyo Disney Resort - Tokyo Disneyland and Tokyo DisneySea - are not part of the allowance, as they are owned and operated by The Oriental Land Company under licenses from Disney. On May 2, 2006, Disney honored the two billionth guest of a Disney park at Disneyland. The guest received a modified version of the Golden Pass entitling the holder to admission to the two theme parks at the Tokyo Disney Resort. The Oriental Land Company allowed this because the two billion count included guests at Tokyo Disneyland and Tokyo DisneySea.
