= Roy O. Disney =

American entrepreneur (1893–1971)

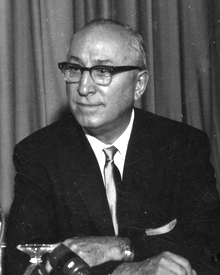
- Disney in 1965
- Born: Roy Oliver Disney; June 24, 1893; Chicago, Illinois, U.S.
- Died: December 20, 1971 (aged 78); Burbank, California, U.S.
- Burial place: Forest Lawn Memorial Park, Hollywood Hills
- Occupation: Businessman
- Years active: 1923–1971
- Title: President, Chairman and CEO of The Walt Disney Company (1945–1971)
- Term: 1945–1968 (President); 1964–1971 (Chairman)
- Predecessor: Walt Disney
- Successor: Donn Tatum
- Political party: Republican
- Spouse: Edna Francis (m. 1925)
- Relatives: Disney family
- Military career
- Branch: United States Navy
- Service years: 1917–1919
- Conflicts: World War I

Roy Oliver Disney (/ˈdɪzni/ DIZ-nee; June 24, 1893 – December 20, 1971) was an American businessman and co-founder of the Disney Brothers Cartoon Studio in 1923, then known as Walt Disney Productions from 1929 onwards, and now known since 1986 as the Walt Disney Company, alongside his brother Walt Disney.

Disney's financial and business operational acumen served as the foundation of his career, making his brother's creative ambitions possible. He served as the co-founder of the Disney Brothers Cartoon Studio from 1923 to 1929, before transitioning to the renamed Walt Disney Productions Executive Vice President from 1929 to 1945. From there, he would go onto serve most notably as the President of Walt Disney Productions from 1945 to 1968, and then, as chairman of The Walt Disney Company from 1964 until his death in 1971.

== Early life and education ==
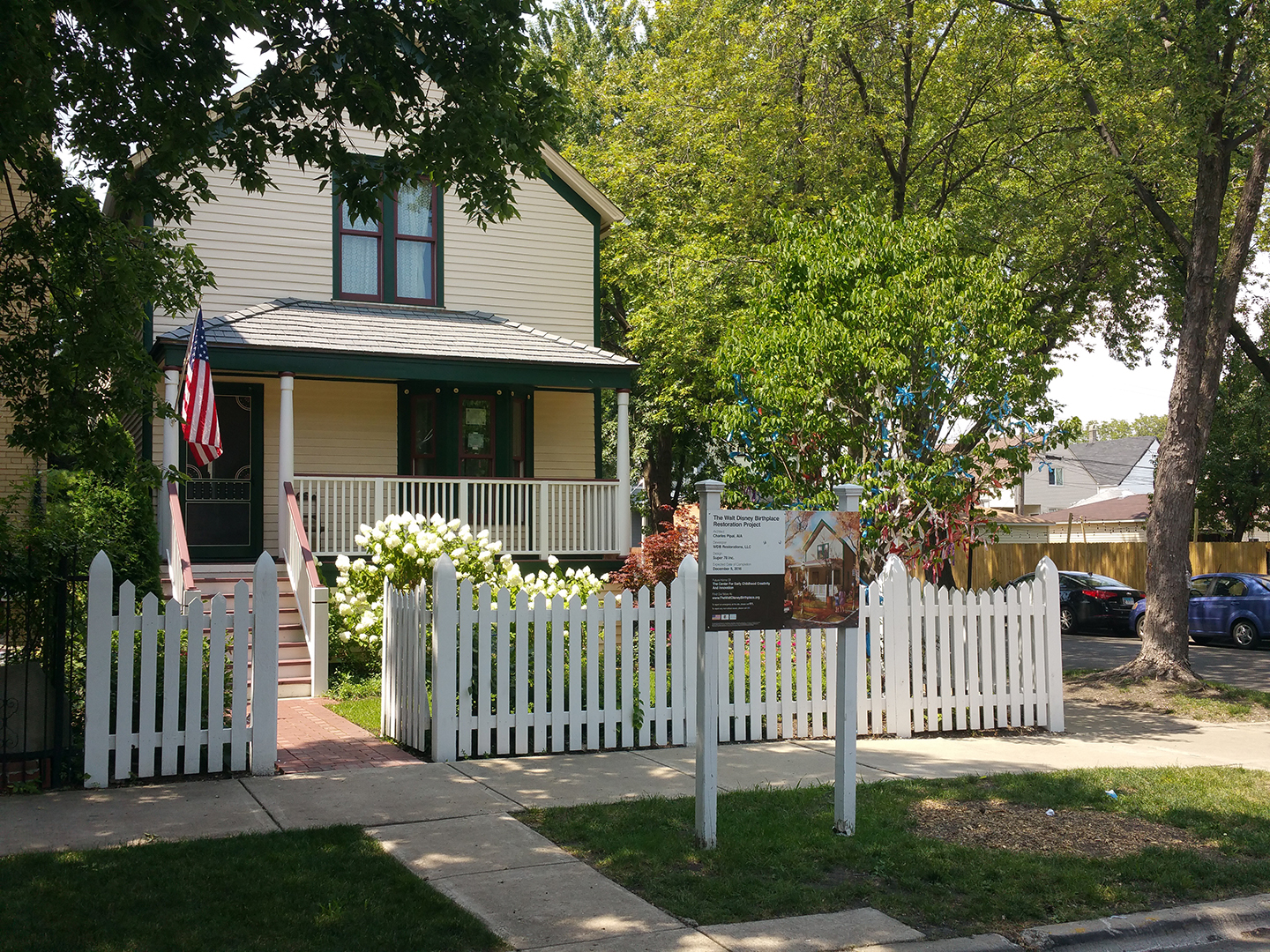
The home in Chicago where Disney was born.

Disney was born to Irish-Canadian Elias Charles Disney and English-German-American Flora Call Disney in Chicago, Illinois, on June 24, 1893. The family moved to Marceline, Missouri, and to Kansas City in 1911.

On July 1, 1911, Elias purchased a newspaper delivery route for The Kansas City Star. It extended from 27th Street to the 31st Street and from Prospect Avenue to Indiana Avenue. Roy and his brother Walt worked as newspaper delivery boys. The family delivered the morning newspaper, The Kansas City Times, to approximately 700 customers and The Kansas City Star to more than 600. The number of customers served increased with time.

Disney graduated from the Manual Training High School of Kansas City in 1912. He left the paper delivery route and worked on a farm in the summer. He was then employed as a bank clerk along with brother Raymond Arnold Disney at the First National Bank of Kansas City.

=== Military service ===
Disney served in the United States Navy from 1917 to 1919. His military career was cut short by a contraction of tuberculosis during his service and Disney was honorably discharged from military duty.

== Career ==
=== Founding Disney Brothers Studio & Early Business Ventures (1923-1945) ===
While convalescing from a recurrence of tuberculosis at the Sawtelle Veterans Home in Los Angeles in October 1923, his brother Walt came to visit late at night to ask for his help in establishing a cartoon studio. After Walt explained that he had secured a deal with New York distributor Margaret Winkler, Disney agreed and left the hospital the next morning - never again having a relapse of tuberculosis.

With $250 contributed from Disney and $500 borrowed from his uncle, the Disney Brothers Studio was born, founded by the brothers Roy and Walt. Walt Disney directed the studio's creative work, but Disney assumed the responsibility for its finance and administrative operations from the start, working primarily as a bookkeeper.

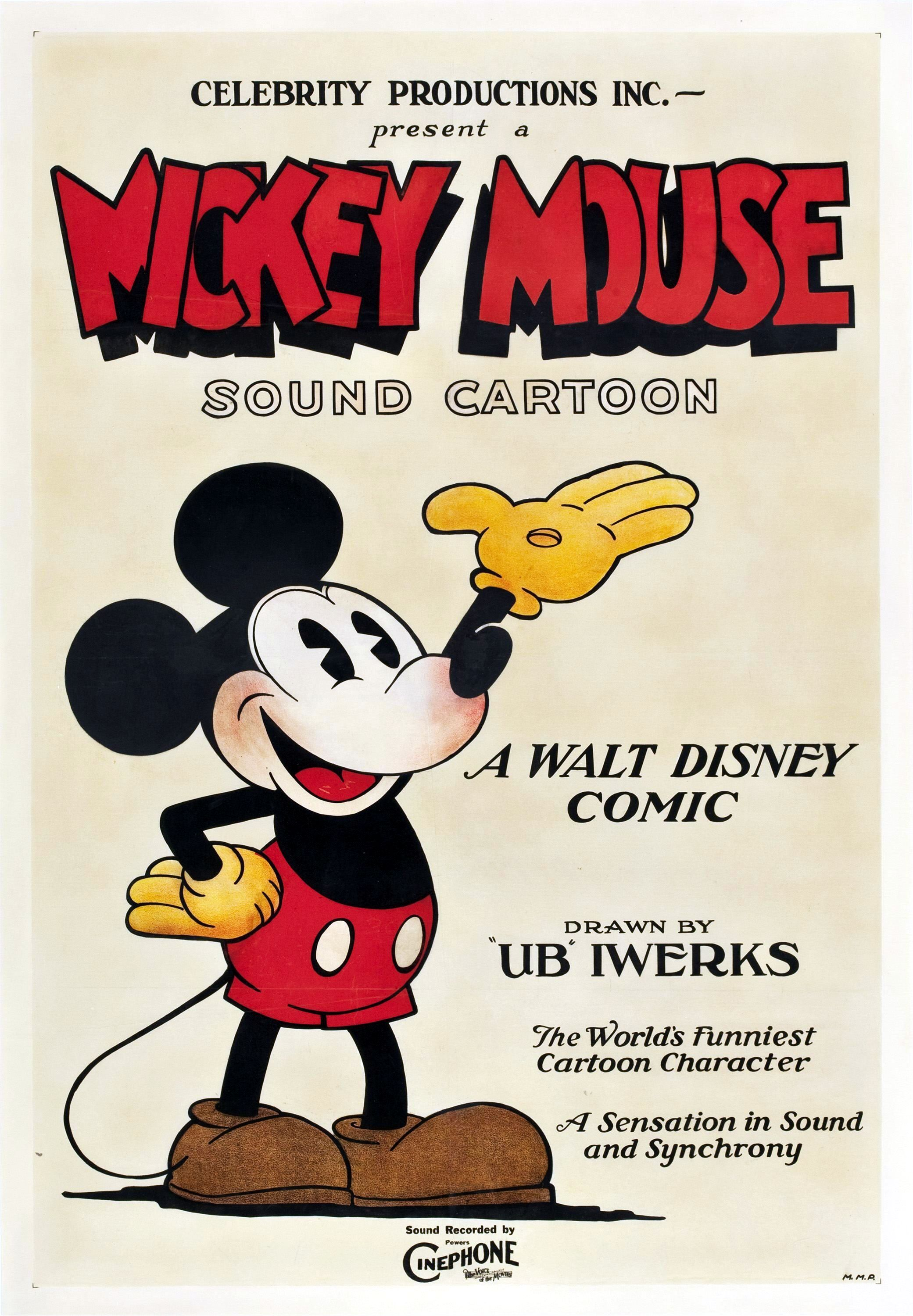
Original Mickey Mouse Poster

In 1926, the studio would be named Walt Disney Studio, following his suggestion that the business operate under Walt's name for simplicity, clarity, and identity. The Disney Brothers Studio served as Winkler Pictures' West Coast branch until 1928. While the identity would last, Roy left Winkler with Walt, Ub Iwerks and a small number of employees to produce the successful Mickey Mouse series and becoming Walt Disney Productions by 1929. Roy would become Executive Vice President, now commonly referred to as the Chief Executive Officer, of the company overseeing its business while his brother, Walt, would further its animation productions.

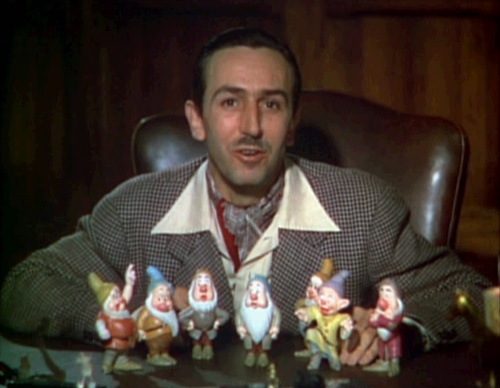
Walt Disney On Air Discussing Snow White & The Seven Dwarfs

Walt Disney Productions first feature-length film in 1937, Snow White and the Seven Dwarfs, despite Roy's attempts to talk his brother Walt out of it, would be one of the few business decisions made by Walt that would usher in significant expansion of the company. It's near-unanimous acclaim, generating $418 million in the box office alone, would lead Walt and Roy to finance a $4.5 million studio in Burbank by 1940 which remains the site of Walt Disney Studios today.

During the 1940s, despite the company's significant expansion and commercial success, Roy would go onto manage the company's finances during World War II which placed pressure on its operations.

=== Company Expansion & Executive Leadership (1945-1966) ===
In 1945, Roy would succeed Walt as President of Walt Disney Productions and manage its financial, administrative, and business development as the company expanded beyond animated pictures with his brother, Walt, as the creative and production throne.

From 1945 to 1955, Roy got the company back on track, making a series of consequential decisions that would allow Walt Disney Production to thrive. One of those decisions being in 1953, when Roy established Buena Vista Distribution Company, eliminating reliance on outside distributors and giving the company greater control over its own production distributions and commercial returns. Other decisions included expansion of the company's consumer-product licensing business, turning Disney characters and properties into revenue beyond the big screen, and supporting Walt's vision logistically for the company to enter into theme-park entertainment market by 1955 with the opening of Disneyland.

In 1964, Walt relinquished the chairman title so he could focus more on the creative aspects of the company. Roy would transition to serving as chairman of the board, further overseeing the business operations and leading the charge on a diversified portfolio that included television programming, live-action films like Swiss Family Robinson and Mary Poppins, consumer products, and further theme-park development.

=== Leadership Following Walt Disney's Death (1966-1971) ===
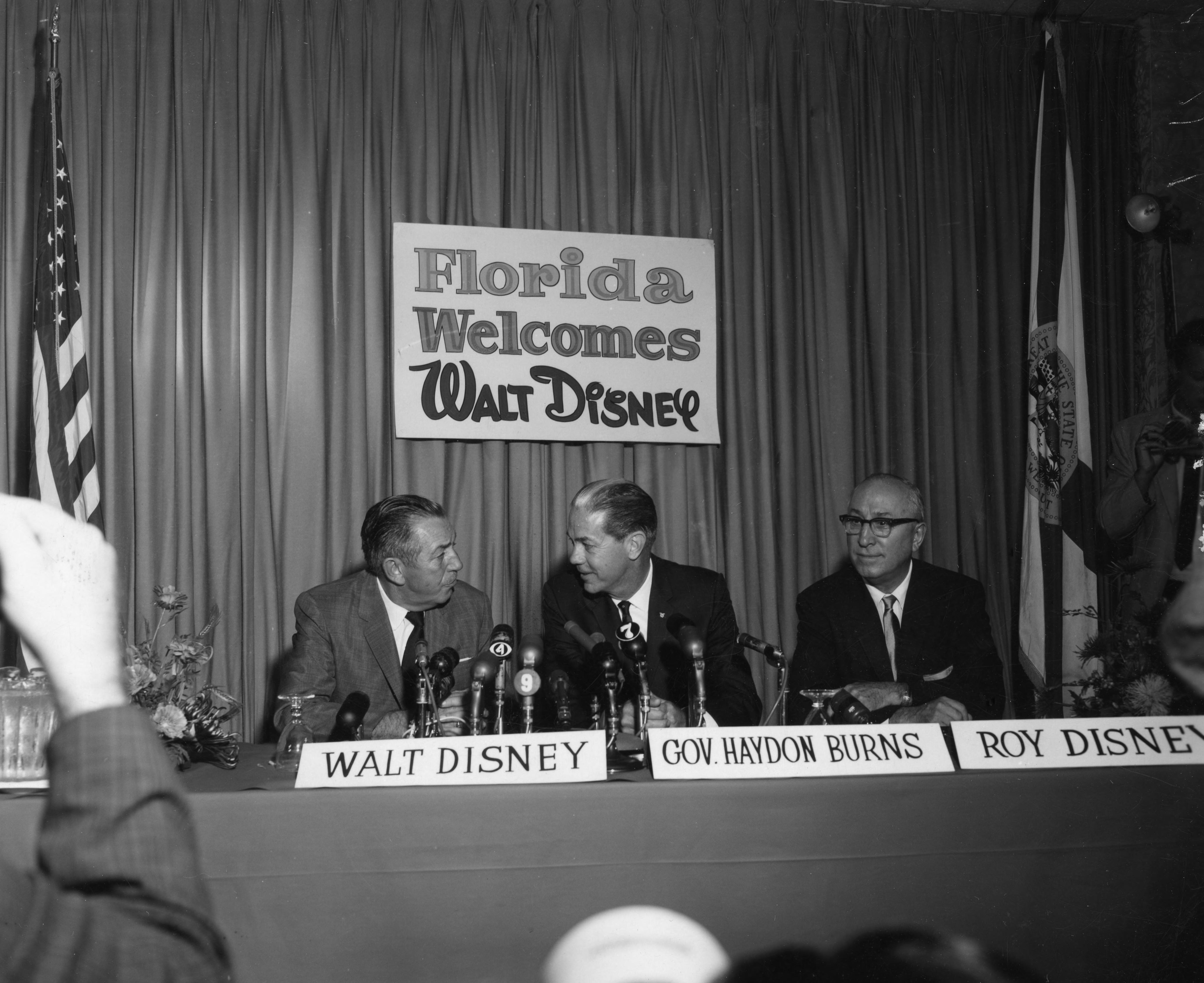
Disney (right) with his brother Walt Disney (left) and then-Governor of Florida W. Haydon Burns (center) on November 15, 1965, publicly announcing the creation of Disney World

Shortly after taking over as chairman of Walt Disney Productions in 1964, his brother, Walt Disney, would pass away from lung cancer in 1966 just short of seeing the Florida Project, later known as Disney World in 1965, come to fruition.

Although Roy had planned to retire, he postponed his retirement to oversee the project and ensure its completion following the loss of its original imagineer, Walt. As John Hench, a Disney Renaissance artist and mentee of Walt, recalls, Roy shared "I simply had to do it. Because when I meet Walt again, if I hadn’t even tried to build that thing, I would really catch hell.” Hench said, “He really believed that…And he did it for Walt.”

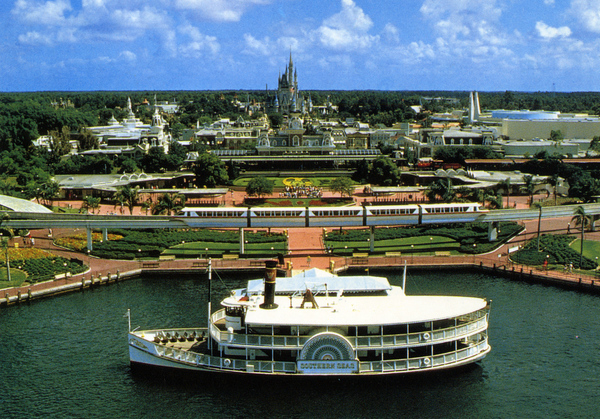

Though the development required substantial financial investment, construction, transportation, accommodations, and theme-park operations, by 1971 the project would include the Magic Kingdom, two resort hotels (Disney's Contemporary Resort & Disney's Polynesian Village Resort), and a variety of other facilities covering just some of the 27,440 acres of land purchased by Walt in 1965.

On October 1st, 1971, Disney World would open as Walt Disney World, a tribute from Roy to his brother, Walt, as the dreamer, imagineer, and visionary for this project. Once again, Roy's business leadership allowed the resort at a cost of $400 million to open without having additional debt. Roy would attend the grand opening and participate in the resort's dedication to Walt later that month.

Roy passed away on December 20th, 1971, less than three months after the resort opened.

== Personal life and death ==
Disney was married to Edna Francis from April 1925 until his death. Disney met Francis in Kansas City, Missouri when she worked at The Kansas City Times along with close friend Meredith A. Boyington, and she introduced Boyington to Disney's older brother Raymond Arnold Disney. Raymond and Meredith were married and were lifetime close friends to Edna and Roy; they had two sons, Charles Elias Disney and Daniel H. Disney. Roy and Edna's son Roy Edward Disney was born on January 10, 1930.

Roy E. Disney later was vice chairman of the Walt Disney Company. Throughout his life, Roy O. Disney rejected the publicity and fame that came with being Walt's brother. Disney's nephew Charles Elias Disney chose to name his son Charles Roy Disney in Disney's honor. Disney remained a member of the Freemasons for decades before he resigned his membership.

=== Death ===
After the opening of Walt Disney World on October 1, 1971, Disney finally retired, but soon after he died from a stroke at the age of 78 on December 20, 1971. He is interred in Forest Lawn Memorial Park (Hollywood Hills) next to his wife Edna in Los Angeles.

== Legacy ==
Roy O. Disney's left an invaluable mark on the entertainment industry through his role in building and sustaining one of the world's most influential entertainment companies. While Walt may always be known as the creator, without Roy's financial judgement, business leadership, and organizational foundation, Walt's ambitions may have never came into reality. Whether it be his contributions to the company's growth, expansion, and continuity following Walt's death, Roy's leadership has define a legacy not defined by a company name but its lasting institutions, works, and experiences that have now further grown and prospered through the foundation he built.

== Legacy Land Marks ==
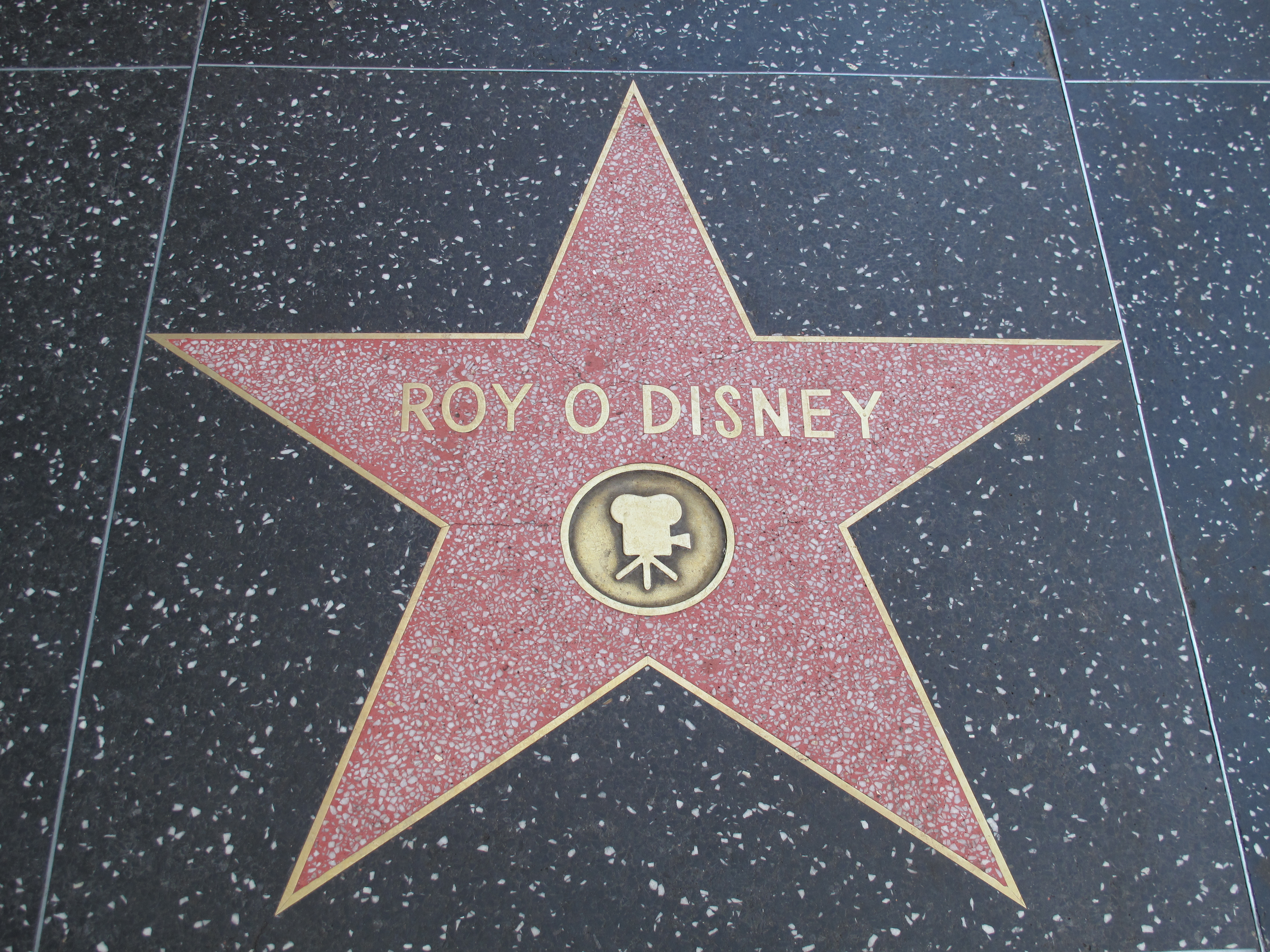
Disney's star on the Hollywood Walk of Fame

Roy received a star on Hollywood Boulevard, in front of the El Capitan Theater, in 1998, 38 years after Walt received one of the first, but now infamous, stars ever on the Walk of Fame.

Sharing the Magic, a statue of Disney seated on a park bench beside Minnie Mouse, was dedicated in October 1999 as a companion piece to the Partners statue of Walt and Mickey Mouse. The statue is located in the Town Square of Main Street, U.S.A., at the Magic Kingdom at the Walt Disney World Resort. A duplicate of Sharing the Magic is located outside the Team Disney building at Disney's corporate headquarters in Burbank, California—dedicated in 2003. A second copy is at the World Bazaar section of Tokyo Disneyland. The Roy O. Disney Suite is located on the top floor of the Hong Kong Disneyland Hotel.

One of the Walt Disney World Railroad locomotives was named after Disney. On June 6, 2002, his son Roy E. Disney rededicated this locomotive in his father's honor. In September 2016, the locomotive took part in its centennial celebration hosted by the Carolwood Pacific Historical Society.

One of the three Hong Kong Disneyland Railroad locomotives is also named after Disney, where each locomotive is named after a past Walt Disney Company president.

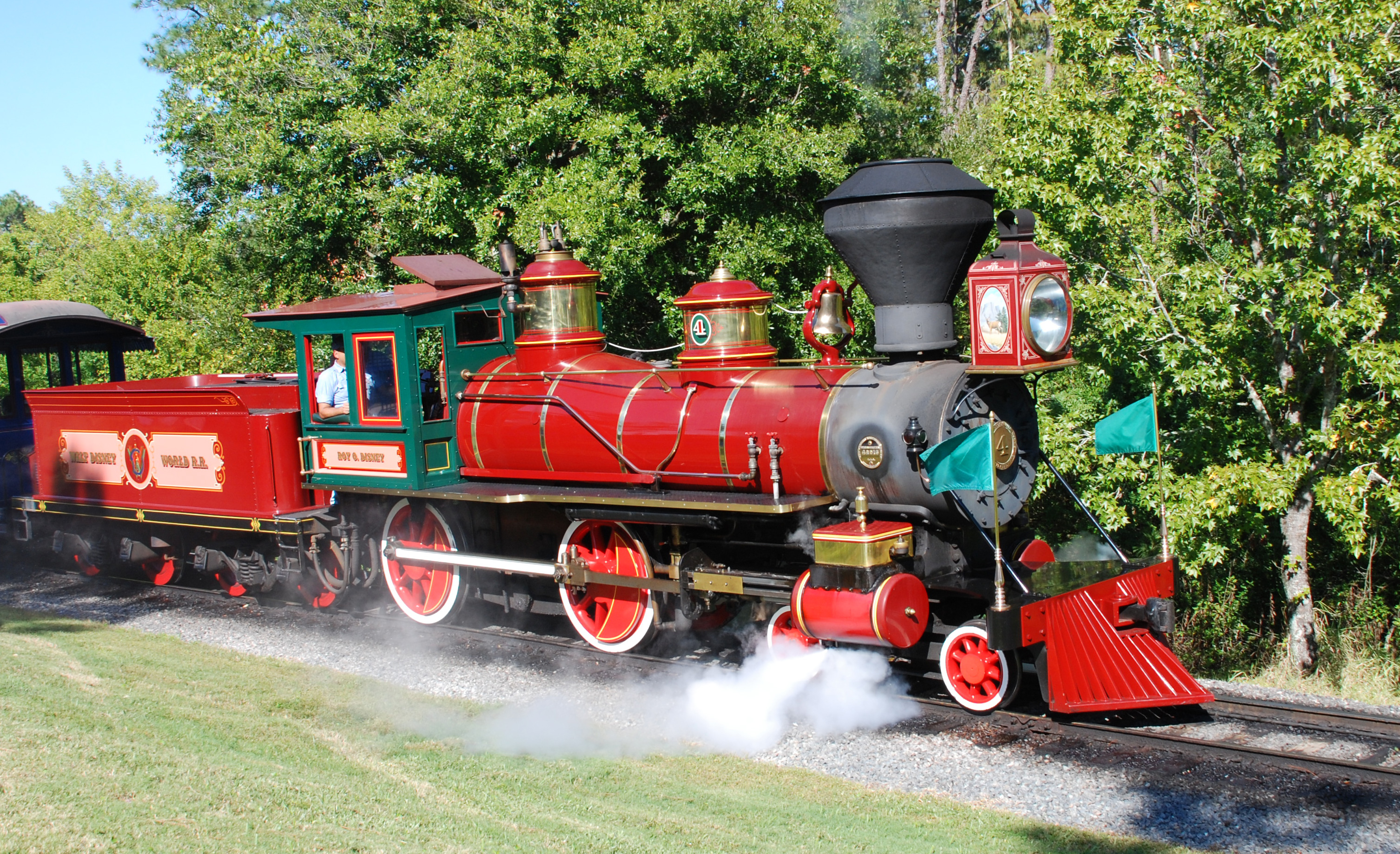
Walt Disney World Railroad No. 4 Roy O. Disney

The Roy O. Disney Concert Hall, the primary performance space for the Herb Alpert School of Music at the California Institute of the Arts (of which Disney was a benefactor), is named after him.

In 2014, Disney was portrayed in the feature film Walt Before Mickey by Jon Heder.

== See also ==
- Walt Disney (2015 PBS film)

Business positions
Preceded by none	CEO of The Walt Disney Company position created–1971	Succeeded by Donn Tatum
Preceded by Walt Disney	President of The Walt Disney Company; 1945–1968	Succeeded by Donn Tatum
Preceded by position vacant	Chairman of The Walt Disney Company; 1964–1971	Succeeded by Donn Tatum
