= Marceline, Missouri =

- City
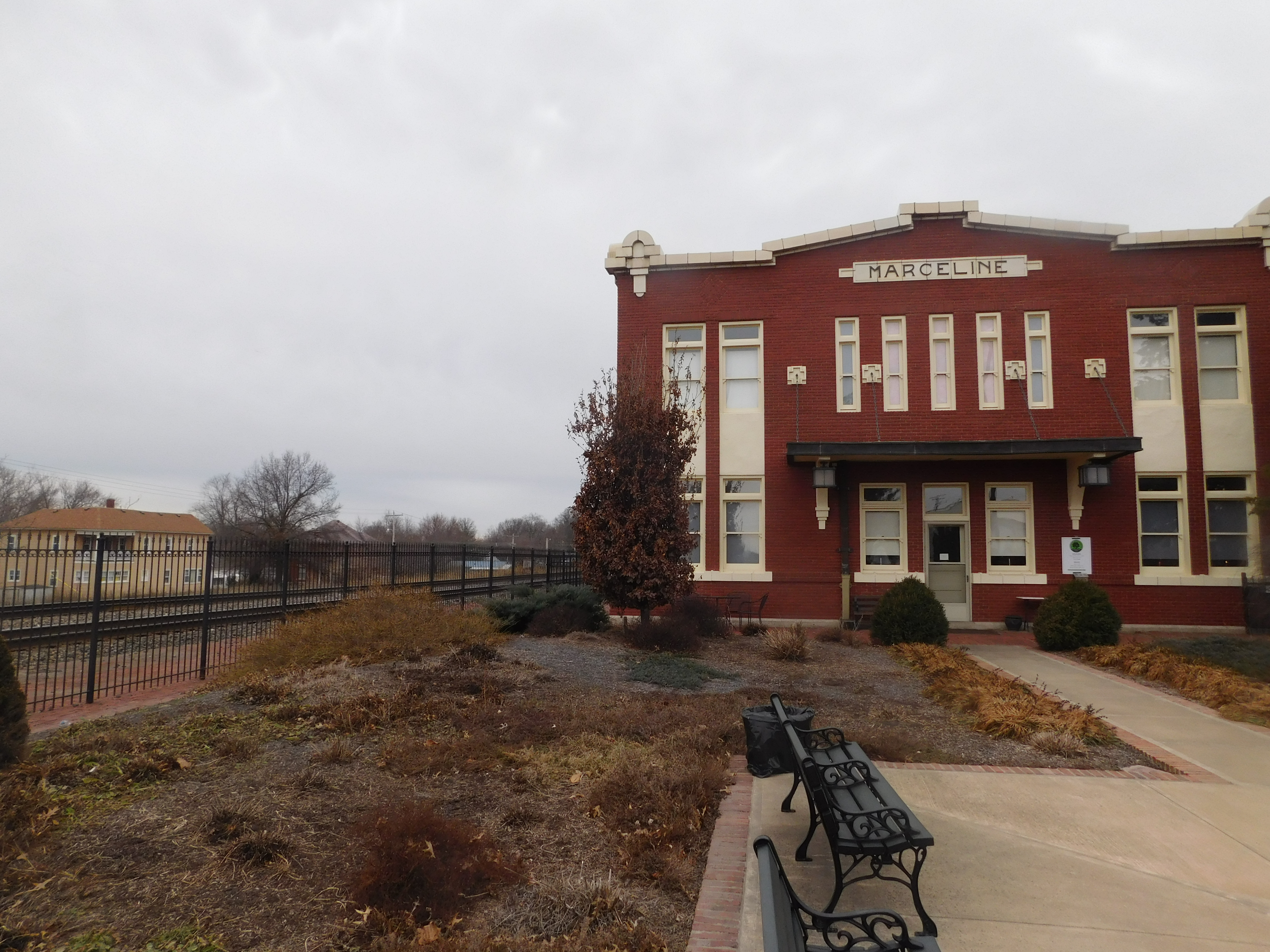
- The former Atchison, Topeka and Santa Fe Railway depot became the Walt Disney Hometown Museum.

- Location within Linn County and Missouri
- Coordinates: 39°43′00″N 92°56′50″W
- Country: United States
- State: Missouri
- Counties: Linn, Chariton
- Incorporated: March 6, 1888; 138 years ago

Government
  - Mayor: Shelly Milford
  - City manager: Jesse Wallis

Area
  - Total: 3.32 sq mi (8.60 km^{2})
  - Land: 3.28 sq mi (8.50 km^{2})
  - Water: 0.039 sq mi (0.10 km^{2})
- Elevation: 867 ft (264 m)

Population (2020)
  - Total: 2,123
  - Density: 647.1/sq mi (249.83/km^{2})
- Time zone: UTC-6 (Central (CST))
  - Summer (DST): UTC-5 (CDT)
- ZIP code: 64658
- Area code: 660
- FIPS code: 29-45866
- GNIS feature ID: 2395002
- Website: marcelinemo.us

Marceline (/ˌmɑːrsəˈliːn/ MAR-sə-LEEN) is a city in Chariton and Linn counties in the U.S. state of Missouri. The population was 2,123 at the 2020 census.

== History ==
In 1887, the Chicago, Santa Fe, and California Railway began construction on a rail line between Chicago and Kansas City, Kansas. It ran through southeast Linn County, prompting new towns such as Marceline. The completed line was absorbed into the Atchison, Topeka, and Santa Fe Railway. The first land parcel in what became the town was sold in January 1888, and the town was incorporated two months later. By the end of the year, it had a railway roundhouse and yard.

In March 1903, the Atchison, Topeka, and Santa Fe Railway divided the line into two districts, with the Missouri district headquarters in Marceline.

The town was named after Marcelina, the wife of a railroad man. A post office called Marceline has operated since 1887.

Marceline is most famous as the boyhood home of Walt Disney and served as the inspiration for Main Street, USA. It hosts the Walt Disney Hometown Museum.

== Geography ==
According to the United States Census Bureau, the city has a total area of 3.32 square miles (8.60 km^{2}), of which 3.28 square miles (8.50 km^{2}) is land and 0.04 square miles (0.10 km^{2}) is water.

=== Climate ===
Climate data for Marceline, Missouri
Month	Jan	Feb	Mar	Apr	May	Jun	Jul	Aug	Sep	Oct	Nov	Dec	Year
Record high °F (°C)	74 (23)	79 (26)	86 (30)	92 (33)	98 (37)	106 (41)	116 (47)	108 (42)	103 (39)	95 (35)	82 (28)	72 (22)	116 (47)
Mean daily maximum °F (°C)	33 (1)	40 (4)	52 (11)	63 (17)	73 (23)	82 (28)	87 (31)	85 (29)	77 (25)	67 (19)	50 (10)	37 (3)	62 (17)
Mean daily minimum °F (°C)	14 (−10)	19 (−7)	30 (−1)	40 (4)	51 (11)	61 (16)	66 (19)	64 (18)	54 (12)	43 (6)	30 (−1)	19 (−7)	41 (5)
Record low °F (°C)	−21 (−29)	−18 (−28)	−15 (−26)	13 (−11)	29 (−2)	41 (5)	46 (8)	43 (6)	30 (−1)	16 (−9)	−7 (−22)	−24 (−31)	−24 (−31)
Average precipitation inches (mm)	1.50 (38)	1.48 (38)	2.74 (70)	3.61 (92)	4.78 (121)	4.11 (104)	4.74 (120)	4.08 (104)	4.38 (111)	3.34 (85)	2.96 (75)	2.01 (51)	39.73 (1,009)
Average snowfall inches (cm)	5.5 (14)	4.2 (11)	2.9 (7.4)	0.4 (1.0)	0 (0)	0 (0)	0 (0)	0 (0)	0 (0)	0 (0)	1 (2.5)	4.4 (11)	18.4 (46.9)

== Demographics ==
Historical population
Census	Pop.	Note	%±
1880	872		—
1890	1,977		126.7%
1900	2,638		33.4%
1910	3,920		48.6%
1920	3,760		−4.1%
1930	3,555		−5.5%
1940	3,206		−9.8%
1950	3,172		−1.1%
1960	2,872		−9.5%
1970	2,622		−8.7%
1980	2,938		12.1%
1990	2,645		−10.0%
2000	2,558		−3.3%
2010	2,233		−12.7%
2020	2,123		−4.9%
U.S. Decennial Census

=== 2020 census ===
As of the 2020 census, Marceline had a population of 2,123. The median age was 39.9 years. 25.0% of residents were under the age of 18 and 19.7% of residents were 65 years of age or older. For every 100 females there were 90.4 males, and for every 100 females age 18 and over there were 86.2 males age 18 and over.

0.0% of residents lived in urban areas, while 100.0% lived in rural areas.

There were 924 households in Marceline, of which 30.1% had children under the age of 18 living in them. Of all households, 41.0% were married-couple households, 18.5% were households with a male householder and no spouse or partner present, and 33.2% were households with a female householder and no spouse or partner present. About 36.5% of all households were made up of individuals and 19.8% had someone living alone who was 65 years of age or older.

There were 1,110 housing units, of which 16.8% were vacant. The homeowner vacancy rate was 3.8% and the rental vacancy rate was 13.5%.

Racial composition as of the 2020 census
Race	Number	Percent
White	1,961	92.4%
Black or African American	12	0.6%
American Indian and Alaska Native	4	0.2%
Asian	9	0.4%
Native Hawaiian and Other Pacific Islander	5	0.2%
Some other race	25	1.2%
Two or more races	107	5.0%
Hispanic or Latino (of any race)	69	3.3%

=== 2010 census ===
At the 2010 census there were 2,233 people, 970 households, and 606 families living in the city. The population density was 680.8 inhabitants per square mile (262.9/km^{2}). There were 1,151 housing units at an average density of 350.9 units per square mile (135.5 units/km^{2}). The racial makeup of the city was 98.0% White, 0.3% African American, 0.1% Native American, 0.1% Asian, 0.2% from other races, and 1.3% from two or more races. Hispanic or Latino of any race were 1.4%.

Of the 970 households 30.5% had children under the age of 18 living with them, 48.4% were married couples living together, 9.4% had a female householder with no husband present, 4.7% had a male householder with no wife present, and 37.5% were non-families. 34.0% of households were one person and 16.8% were one person aged 65 or older. The average household size was 2.30 and the average family size was 2.94.

The median age was 39.8 years. 25.1% of residents were under the age of 18; 7.7% were between the ages of 18 and 24; 22.8% were from 25 to 44; 26% were from 45 to 64; and 18.3% were 65 or older. The gender makeup of the city was 46.6% male and 53.4% female.

=== 2000 census ===
At the 2000 census there were 2,558 people, 1,079 households, and 690 families living in the city. The population density was 787.1 inhabitants per square mile (303.9/km^{2}). There were 1,237 housing units at an average density of 380.6 units per square mile (147.0 units/km^{2}). The racial makeup of the city was 98.20% White, 0.12% African American, 0.78% Native American, 0.20% Asian, 0.20% from other races, and 0.51% from two or more races. Hispanic or Latino of any race were 0.82%.

Of the 1,079 households 31.0% had children under the age of 18 living with them, 48.8% were married couples living together, 11.4% had a female householder with no husband present, and 36.0% were non-families. 32.4% of households were one person and 17.6% were one person aged 65 or older. The average household size was 2.32 and the average family size was 2.95.

The age distribution was 26.7% under the age of 18, 7.6% from 18 to 24, 24.4% from 25 to 44, 21.7% from 45 to 64, and 19.6% 65 or older. The median age was 39 years. For every 100 females, there were 84.7 males. For every 100 females age 18 and over, there were 78.2 males.

The median household income was $25,164 and the median family income was $35,948. Males had a median income of $26,786 versus $17,382 for females. The per capita income for the city was $15,086. About 9.0% of families and 13.1% of the population were below the poverty line, including 15.3% of those under age 18 and 19.5% of those age 65 or over.

== Education ==
Public education is administered by the Marceline R-V School District.

There is also a Catholic School, Father McCartan's Memorial School, for grades K-8

The Marceline Carnegie Library is a public library.

== Notable people ==
- Walt Disney (1901–1966), animator and founder of The Walt Disney Company, spent four childhood years on a farm near Marceline. The family moved to Kansas City, Missouri, where he founded the animation studio Laugh-O-Gram Studio. Main Street, USA in Disney theme parks worldwide was inspired by his childhood in Marceline. The Walt Disney Hometown Museum is located in the former Santa Fe rail depot.
- Marian Ainslee (1896 – 1966), an American screenwriter and researcher active during Hollywood's silent film era.
