= Walt Disney (film) =

- DVD cover
- Genre: Documentary film
- Written by: Sarah Colt; Tom Jennings; Mark Zwonitzer
- Directed by: Sarah Colt
- Narrated by: Oliver Platt
- Theme music composer: Joel Goodman
- Country of origin: United States
- Original language: English
- No. of episodes: 2

Production
- Producers: Sarah Colt; Molly Jacobs
- Cinematography: John Baynard
- Editors: Mark Dugas; Glenn Fukushima; Jon Neuburger
- Running time: 222 minutes
- Production company: Sarah Colt Productions

Original release
- Network: PBS
- Release: September 14, 2015

Walt Disney is a documentary film created by PBS for the American Experience program. The two-part, four-hour documentary premiered on September 14, 2015, with part two on the following day and centers on the life, times and legacy of Walt Disney. According to Sarah Colt, director of the documentary film, the biggest challenge was "capturing the truth of the man who had such [an] outsized influence and notoriety ... People think they know him but in reality they don't know him ... He was a human being with many layers of complexity". Rob Lowman, of the Los Angeles Daily News, described "Disneyesque" as being "synonymous with a specific artistic style and, eventually, a fantasy world". Richard Sherman, a Disney songwriter, recalled that "Disney was never driven by a desire for wealth or fame. He wanted to be seen as a master storyteller ... He got great joy out of making people happy with his movies".

== Participants ==
The documentary film is narrated by Oliver Platt and includes the following participants (alphabetized by last name):

- Michael Barrier (historian)
- Rolly Crump (Disney Imagineer)
- Susan J. Douglas (media historian)
- Neal Gabler (historian and journalist)
- Robert Givens (Disney animator)
- Bob Gurr (Disney Imagineer)
- Don Hahn (artist, producer and writer)
- Carmenita Higginbotham (art historian; University of Virginia)
- Don Lusk (Disney animator)
- Ron Miller (son-in-law)
- Floyd Norman (Disney animator)
- Mark Samels (producer)
- Richard Schickel (historian and film critic)
- Richard Sherman (Disney songwriter)
- Ron Suskind (writer of Life, Animated)
- Ruthie Tompson (Disney artist)

== Reviews and criticism ==
The film was met with mixed reviews for its presentation of Walt.

According to Neil Genzlinger of The New York Times: "Before [Walt Disney] became synonymous with a staid, whitewashed version of Americana, [he] was considered a boundary pusher, expanding the possibilities and ambitions of his art form ... [the documentary film is] a workmanlike treatment of a titanic life ... [and] makes you feel the limitations of the familiar 'American Experience' format: no-nonsense narration; archival footage and photographs; talking heads delivering sound-bite-length flourishes". Cynthia Littleton, of Variety, writes that "Walt Disney was a dictator who ruled his studio with an iron fist. Walt Disney was a generous soul who loved nothing more than making people happy. Both of those sides of the man who has achieved mythic status were on display [in the documentary film]". Neal Gabler, author of the biography "Walt Disney: The Triumph of the American Imagination" (2006), writes that "the film takes the measure of [Walt Disney] as a human being".

It was nominated for a Peabody Award.

== See also ==
- Walt: The Man Behind the Myth
- Walt Disney: An American Original
- The Disney Version
- Walt Disney: Hollywood's Dark Prince
- Walt & El Grupo
