= The Perfect American =

2013 opera by Philip Glass

- Opera by Philip Glass
- Librettist: Rudy Wurlitzer
- Language: English
- Based on: Der König von Amerika by Peter Stephan Jungk
- Premiere: 22 January 2013; Teatro Real, Madrid

The Perfect American is an opera in two acts composed in 2011–12 by Philip Glass. It is an adaptation of the Peter Stephan Jungk novel Der König von Amerika, a fictional work that re-imagines Walt Disney in his later years as a power-hungry racist. It was commissioned by the Teatro Real in Madrid in co-production with the English National Opera in London.

The world premiere of the work took place at the Teatro Real on 22 January 2013 with Dennis Russell Davies conducting and directed by Phelim McDermott. The first English production was on 1 June 2013 by the English National Opera at the London Coliseum, under the direction of Gareth Jones.

Jones and McDermott directed the third production with Opera Queensland (Australia) for the Brisbane Festival, commencing 15 September 2014. Christopher Purves, the baritone who sang the role of Walt, and Marie McLaughlin who played the role of Walt’s wife, also participated in a televised TV chat show about the opera along with McDermott.

The Madrid premiere was broadcast live on medici.tv and recorded for subsequent DVD release.

== Genesis ==
The Perfect American arose from a commission of the New York City Opera in September 2008. The project idea was suggested by Gerard Mortier, who was appointed director in February 2007, and gave a copy of Jungk's novel to Philip Glass, seeing a perfect frame for a future production.

== Libretto ==
The libretto by Rudy Wurlitzer is based on the controversial biographical novel Der König von Amerika by Peter Stephan Jungk. When he was a child, Jungk's parents received frequent visits from their friend, physicist Heinz Haber, who at the time worked for Disney as a scientific consultant. The novel imagines the last three months of the life of Walt Disney from the tales of the fictional Austrian cartoonist Wilhelm Dantine, who – before being fired – had worked for Disney between 1940 and 1950. The creator of Mickey Mouse is depicted as something of a megalomaniac racist, misogynist (only men were allowed to draw, women were only allowed coloring) anti-Semite and Nazi sympathiser, and for exposing three of his employees before the Committee on Un-American Activities. Disney, played in the opera by Christopher Purves, comments on the march on Washington in August 1963: "Where leads all this freedom, negroes walking to Washington, the misfits who fornicate like rabbits?"

Glass describes the last years of the life of Walt Disney "unimaginable, alarming and truly frightening", but cedes him responsibility for his own ideas because he believes they are the product of the context in which he lived. He sees him as "a child of his time with very conservative ideas, yes, but a great visionary", "a human being in ordinary and extraordinary times", "an icon of modernity, a man capable of building bridges between high culture and popular culture". In this sense it recalls that "Disney has always been conscious of the attitudes of ordinary people and also allowed the masses to address the high culture by introducing the music of Tchaikovsky and others in his films." For him, his opera "is not a documentary or portrait" but a "journey poetic and tragic" through the last months of the life of an artist who "faced the same doubts that beset us all". He therefore conceived the work as a kind of poem on the quintessentially American and a reflection on death.

== Roles ==
Roles, voice types, premiere cast
Role	Voice type	Premiere cast, 22 January 2013
Walt Disney	baritone	Christopher Purves
Roy Disney	bass-baritone	David Pittsinger
Wilhelm Dantine	tenor	Donald Kaasch
Hazel George	soprano	Janis Kelly
Lillian Disney	soprano	Marie McLaughlin
Sharon	soprano	Sarah Tynan
Diane	soprano	Nazan Friket
Lucy/Josh	soprano	Rosie Lomas
Chuck/A doctor	tenor	Juan Noval
A nurse	soprano	Noelia Buñuel
A secretary	soprano	Beatriz de Gàlvez
Andy Warhol	tenor	John Easterlin
Abraham Lincoln	bass	Zachary James

== Synopsis ==
Scenes from the end of the life of Walt Disney. The action goes from Disney's home town of Marceline, Missouri to his animated dream factory in Los Angeles. Disney is haunted by his own mortality, set against the backdrop of the creation of his visionary empire of imagination.

=== Act 1 ===
Prologue

In his hospital bed, Walt Disney, in delirium, dreams about an owl. His dream quickly transforms into a nightmare: "No! No! Go away! I drift without knowing what is real and what is not". The dream is in part, a distant memory. As a child Walt killed an owl with his bare hands as he believed the bird represented a bad omen. Walt wishes to return to his hometown, Marceline, Missouri ... Where dreams come true.

Scene 1

Walt and his brother Roy recall joy and simplicity in their youth in Marceline, a small town in the Midwest where they grew up. In the magical realm of their imagination Marceline was "the soul of America where every day was magical." The residents of Marceline welcome Walt as a god. Walt is present at the inauguration of a local public pool where Wilhelm Dantine makes an appearance.

Scene 2

Walt is gravely ill in the hospital and bitterly considers his death: "We all have the same problem. We will all die." Nurse Hazel, his "Snow White", comforts him. Walt is filled with fear: "I'm afraid that my empire is collapsing when I am no more." He asks the nurse to make sure he is cryonised when he dies: "Put me in the mirror or congèle me in liquid nitrogen." He hopes to conquer death to become a messiah for those who fear it. His wife Lilian, his brother Roy, and his daughters Diane and Sharon visit him. Walt asks them to swear on the American flag to honor their vow never to utter the word "die".

Scene 3

A few years earlier, in his studio office in Burbank, he recalls his successes with his brother Roy: "From Japan to Mongolia, Nepal, Portugal, Greenland, Peru, billions of people know who Walt Disney is. But we must do better, we must do more ... ". Both men are preparing plans for Disneyland and deplore the ugly presence of modernity. Walt compares himself to Thomas Edison and Henry Ford. He boasts of being the man through whom Ronald Reagan will become president and believes he will become more famous than Santa Claus, Moses, Zeus and Jesus. Dantine confronts Walt about being unfairly fired.

Scene 4

Lilian has good news for Walt. His condition has stabilized. At his home in Holmby Hills, his family throws him a surprise party for his 65th birthday. Lucy, a neighbor and a strange girl, arrives wearing an owl mask. Lucy does not seem to know who Walt or his most famous characters are. She refuses to leave, and Walt throws her out. He believes she represents the demon owl he killed as a child.

Scene 5

In Anaheim, late at night, Walt is attempting to build an animatronic Abraham Lincoln, and is struggling with failure. As he tries to fix the machine he convinces himself that he and Lincoln both belong to the same class of American icons: "Despite all the obstacles, we've made something of ourselves. We changed the world. We are folk heroes ..." However, he realizes that he no longer shares the same beliefs as the illustrious heroes of his childhood: "You have been a proponent of the black race. That's a big difference between us." "I revere you, Mr. President, but our views do not coincide anymore." The animatronic Lincoln's stutters while performing his famous speech on freedom. Walt cradles the machine in his arms and proclaims the power of the USA.

=== Act 2 ===
Andy Warhol in 1977

Scene 1

Andy Warhol approaches Roy to propose that he include Walt in a series of painted portraits of American superstars. Roy does not give him permission, but tells Warhol he will pass on the proposal to Walt. Warhol proclaims his love for Disney, "Tell Walt I love it and I love his work. Tell him that we are one and the same."

Scene 2

The choir sings: "Driving fast or slow to LA where everything is possible and everything is doable. Where the world is a playground and where dreams come true", and recites the names of cities that separate Missouri and LA. A family walks in the garden and sees Walt aboard a miniature train. The train derails as Dantine reenters.

Scene 3

Walt recalls that Dantine was fired for trying to form a union and comments on his "stupid leftist" ideas: "I fired him because his leftist and unpatriotic comments insult all that Disney represents"; Walt dreams of a machine that would be able to replace his entire workforce. Dantine asks for compensation. The chorus sings about how Walt is a magician who can do nothing wrong. Dantine accuses Walt of being a thief.

Scene 4

Walt meets Josh, a fellow patient, as he is admitted into the intensive care unit. Josh is thrilled to have Walt as a neighbor. The doctor gives Liliane and her family Walt's diagnosis. Walt has advanced lung cancer. The doctor recommends removing a lung giving Walt, at best, two years to live.

Scene 5

Josh asks him how he created and drew so many characters. Walt replies that he is a great storyteller, who motivates and inspires his employees: "I have not done everything, but without me there would be no movies." Josh believes Walt is godlike: "I realized, Walt: you are like God." Walt nods thoughtfully, "Well, in a way." A happy god? "Sometimes" he answers.

Scene 6

Walt dies. The choir, and the Disney family, remember Marceline and Walt's idealistic innocence while his spirit observes. Lucy appears as an owl and exits with Walt.

Epilogue

Dantine, dirty and in rags, meets the undertaker at the funeral home. He tells him that Walt will be cremated and not frozen. The chorus recalls the miraculous nature of the dream of Disneyland: never say "die."

== Reception ==
The opera received mixed to negative reviews with Andrew Clements, writing for The Guardian, pointing out Purves's role as Walt alongside the entire cast as "the opera's problem" and calling it "deeply disappointing" compared to Satyagraha while Zachary Woolfe, writing for The New York Times, stated that it was "a pleasure to listen to but dull as drama".

== See also ==
- Walt Disney: Hollywood's Dark Prince, the controversial 1994 book by author Marc Eliot that also portrayed Walt in a negative light
- The Disney Version
- Pop art
