= Bob Hope bibliography =

This is a bibliography of books by Bob Hope (1903–2003), a comedian and actor who appeared on Broadway, in vaudeville, films, television, and on the radio. He was noted for his numerous United Service Organizations (USO) shows entertaining American military personnel. Hope was the author of fourteen books.

- Hope, Bob. They Got Me Covered. Hollywood, CA: Bob Hope, 1941.
- Hope, Bob and Carroll Carroll (uncredited). I Never Left Home. New York: Simon & Schuster, 1944.
- Hope, Bob. Bob Hope's So This is Peace. New York: Simon & Schuster, 1946.
- Hope, Bob and Martin, Pete. Have Tux, Will Travel: Bob Hope's Own Story. New York: Simon & Schuster, 1954. ISBN 0-7432-6103-8.
- Hope, Bob, and Lachman, Mort (uncredited). I Owe Russia $1200. New York: Doubleday, 1963. ISBN 978-0-01-745039-5.
- Hope, Bob. Five Women I Love: Bob Hope's Vietnam Story. Amarillo, TX: Hale Publishing, 1967. ISBN 978-0-517-50455-0.
- Hope, Bob and Martin, Pete. The Last Christmas Show. New York: Doubleday, 1974. ISBN 0-7091-5660-X.
- Hope, Bob and Thomas, Bob. The Road to Hollywood: My 40-Year Love Affair with the Movies. New York: Doubleday, 1977. ISBN 0-385-02292-1.
- Hope, Bob and Netlund, Dwayne. Bob Hope's Confessions of a Hooker: My Lifelong Love Affair with Golf. New York: Doubleday, 1985. ISBN 0-385-17442-X.
- Hope, Bob and Shavelson, Melville. Don't Shoot, It's Only Me: Bob Hope's Comedy History of the United States. New York: Putnam, 1990. ISBN 0-399-13518-9.
- Hope, Bob and Grant, Ward. Bob Hope Remembers World War II: The European Theater and D-Day. Hollywood, CA: Hope Enterprises, 1994. ISBN 1-885997-01-9.
- Hope, Bob and Grant, Ward. Bob Hope's Dear Prez, I Wanna Tell Ya!: A Presidential Jokebook. Los Angeles, California: General Pub. Group, 1996. ISBN 1-57544-009-1.
- Hope, Bob; Hope, Delores; Grant, Ward. Thanks for the Memories. Los Angeles, California: General Publishing Group, 1998. ISBN 1-57544-040-7.
- Hope, Bob and Hope, Linda. Bob Hope: My Life in Jokes. New York: Hyperion Books, 2004. ISBN 1-4013-0742-6.
