= Harvey Brough =

English musician

- Born: 24 October 1957 (age 68); Coventry, England
- Origin: Coventry, England
- Genres: Classical, early music, pop, soul, jazz, folk, world music
- Occupation(s): Musician, composer, arranger, producer
- Instrument(s): Singing, piano
- Years active: 1963–present
- Labels: Hubba! Discs, Hubba Dots, Black Box, Smudged Discs
- Website: http://harveybrough.com/

Harvey Brough (born 24 October 1957) is an English tenor, instrumentalist, composer, producer and arranger. Starting at the age of six as a chorister at Coventry Cathedral, and achieving greatest prominence as founder, leader, musical director and producer of Harvey and the Wallbangers, he has worked in a wide range of musical genres including classical, early music, pop and soul, jazz, folk and world music.

== Early life ==
Born in Coventry, Brough's musical education began at the age of six when he became a chorister at Coventry Cathedral. By the age of thirteen, he was a featured soloist on recordings including music by Bach and Britten. At the age of 17, he studied oboe at the Royal Academy of Music, taught by Evelyn, Lady Barbirolli.

When he was seventeen, his elder brother Lester, then a medical student at Clare College, Cambridge, was killed in a motorcycle accident at the age of nineteen. This formative influence later became the inspiration for his composition Requiem in Blue. In 1978, Brough himself went to Clare College to study music as an undergraduate, where he was taught by the composer John Rutter. While there, he founded, directed and sang in his own consort, the Cambridge University Consort of Voices, whose members included Mark Padmore, Charles Daniels, Gerald Finley and Christopher Purves. He also worked closely with Rutter's own ensemble, the Cambridge Singers.

== Harvey and the Wallbangers ==
While at Cambridge, Brough also formed his own band, Harvey and the Wallbangers. As well as Brough himself, the band's members included Christopher Purves, Jeremy Taylor, Jonny Griffiths, Neil McArthur (who performed under the name Reg Prescott), Richard Allen and Andrew Huggett. Each band member but Huggett, the drummer, contributed vocally to the music as well as playing a variety of instruments. The Wallbangers’ music drew on a variety of musical genres, including doo-wop, blues rock and vocal harmony. As well as performing, Brough acted as musical director and producer for the band.

Harvey and the Wallbangers’ first performance was at the Edinburgh Festival Fringe in 1981; they subsequently performed in a number of venues before becoming a full-time enterprise in 1983. Between then and 1987, they performed new stage shows regularly and in a variety of venues, including the Royal Albert Hall, Sadler's Wells Theatre, The Forum, Ronnie Scott's Jazz Club and the Tempodrom in Berlin, and made many television appearances. The band also performed at the Royal Variety Performance in 1984, and recorded an album with Simon Rattle in 1987. At the same time, he continued to play as a session musician with consorts including the Tallis Scholars, the Taverner Choir The Bourbon Ensemble and other ensembles.

== Early composing and arranging career ==
After Harvey and the Wallbangers’ final performance in May 1987, Brough's professional focus turned towards production and composition. During this time, he specialised in several genres, notably pop, jazz and film music. His work in pop included collaborations with Simon Law and Jazzie B, including the contribution of arrangements to Soul II Soul’s album Volume V Believe in 1995. His jazz career centred around a long collaboration with John Dankworth and his family; this acted as a key formative influence in his orchestration. With Jacqui Dankworth whom he married, he formed the band Field of Blue in 1996; they released two albums, a self-titled debut (1996) and Still (2000).

Brough's composition career at that time was focused on film and television. Credits include the television series Paris for Channel 4, and BBC Radio 4's soap opera Citizens. His collaboration with composer Jocelyn Pook led to contributions to the soundtracks for the film Eyes Wide Shut and the television series In a Land of Plenty.

=== Requiem in Blue ===
Brough's most significant work from this time was his composition Requiem in Blue. This marked a transition for him from solely composing music to also writing lyrics. It combines the words of the requiem mass with a modern musical idiom that combines a wide range of styles, including choral music, folk songs, early music and jazz: the range of his influences to that point. The piece was commissioned by East England Arts and Wingfield Arts. It premiered at Eye Church, Suffolk in 1998, and was the winner of the first Andrew Milne Memorial Prize. It was recorded by Smudged Discs in 2010 with the choirs of Clare College Cambridge and Portsmouth Cathedral, alongside Brough's 2004 pieces Valete in Pace and i carry your heart.

== Middle and later composing and arranging career ==
By the beginning of the twenty-first century, Brough's career largely centred on composition, predominantly working for commission and in partnership with other artists. Notable pieces composed during this time include Valete in Pace (2004), commissioned for the 60th anniversary of D-Day by Portsmouth City Council and the City of Caen and premiered at L'Abbaye aux Hommes, Caen on 6 June 2004. Stumbing over Infinity, a one-act opera written in collaboration with librettist Roswitha Gerlitz, was performed at the Firsts Season in the Linbury Studio Theatre at the Royal Opera House in 2007. The oratorio Thecla was commissioned by the Church of St Peter and St Paul, Wantage as part of an Arts Council-funded project, with a libretto by James Runcie. The suite A Fairy Dream, inspired by Purcell’s The Fairy Queen, was premiered at the Barbican Centre in 2009. The opera Beached, written in collaboration with Lee Hall, was commissioned by Opera North and performed at Bridlington Spa in 2011, with a cast of 300 singers.

At the same time, Brough continued his work as a theatre musical director and working as a producer and arranger for other artists. From 2006 to 2009, he was musical director and producer for Natacha Atlas, acting as producer and arranger for her album Ana Hina. In 2006, he began a long-standing collaboration with singer Clara Sanabras that continues to this day, acting as producer and arranger for her work. The performance of her suite A Hum About Mine Ears at the Barbican Centre in 2016, with two choirs and the Britten Sinfonia, also featured his composition Take This Slave of Music.

=== Independent musical work and Vox Holloway ===
The formation of choir Vox Holloway in 2009 marked the beginning of Brough's career as an independent composer. As Vox Holloway's musical director and composer-in-residence, he has written a series of works that have been performed by the choir at St Luke's, West Holloway. New works by Brough that have been premiered by Vox Holloway include A Particulare Care, The Year of Jubilee, Adolesce, Cry Palestine, Linguis, Incantation of Eden, The City in the Sea and Music on the Mind. The choir has also performed works that have been premiered elsewhere, including Requiem in Blue, The Prophet, Thecla, Ona's Flood and A Fairy Dream.

=== Other musical and academic appointments ===
In 2012, Brough was appointed Turner Sims Professor of Music at the University of Southampton. This permanent role was created for him so that he could take on the role of leader of the university's community choir, University of Southampton Voices; the choir performs his original works as well as other music.

Some notable performances by the choir include:

- "Songs in the Theme of Love" – a performance of afrobeat and reggae songs by Ben Okafor and a collection of jazz pieces performed by Liane Carroll in 2015
- "Sergeant Pepper" – a performance of Sgt. Pepper's Lonely Hearts Club Band by The Beatles in 2018
- "The Village Green Preservation Society" – a performance of The Kinks Are the Village Green Preservation Society by The Kinks, performed at the invitation of Ray Davies in 2019

Brough has also worked extensively with children's choir Young Dissenters; children singing is a notable feature of his work. In May 2017, he was invited to conduct the junior LSO Discovery Choir for the London Symphony Orchestra between September 2017 and Easter 2018, replacing Lucy Griffiths.

== Music and social activism ==
Brough's musical work is often themed around the opportunity to raise awareness of social injustice or other political issues. His composition Ona's Flood, written as a companion piece to Britten’s Noye's Fludde, draws centrally on themes of climate change. A Particulare Care, written in response to a moving exhibit at the Foundling Museum, highlights the plight of orphans and the increasing problem of homelessness. Other works also carry significant social themes: The Year of Jubilee (2013) tells the story of the Fisk Jubilee Singers in a dramatic and moving depiction of slavery in the American South, while Music on the Mind (2015) is based on themes of mental illness; its premiere featured a performance from the Mind and Soul Community Choir, based at the Maudsley Hospital.

== Selected recordings ==
=== with Harvey and the Wallbangers ===
See Harvey and the Wallbangers#Discography

=== with Field of Blue ===
Field Of Blue (Hubba Dots HubCD001, 1996)

Still (Black Box BBJ2017, 2000)

=== Compositions ===
Requiem in Blue / Valete in Pace / i carry your heart (Smudged Discs SMU603, 4 October 2010)
