= Walt Disney: Hollywood's Dark Prince =

Biography by Marc Eliot

- Author: Marc Eliot
- Publication date: 1994
- Media type: Paperback
- Pages: 372
- ISBN: 0-06-100789-7
- OCLC: 31745719
- Dewey Decimal: 791.43/092 B 20
- LC Class: NC1766.U52 D5328 1994

Walt Disney: Hollywood's Dark Prince is a biography by Marc Eliot, presenting a darker picture of entertainer Walt Disney than his popular perception.

== Summary ==
Eliot's book casts a shadow on some of Walt Disney's actions.

It discusses the urban legend that, in preparation for his death in December 1966, Disney had himself cryogenically frozen, in the hopes of being returned to life by medical science in the future. Eliot opines that the myth of Disney being frozen is probably false, although Disney did have a strong interest in cryonics.

Eliot alleges his lifelong anti-Semitism and his covert activities on behalf of the House Un-American Activities Committee as a spy against Communists in Hollywood alongside his alleged right-wing politics, including an incident in which Disney allegedly wore a Barry Goldwater badge while receiving the Medal of Freedom from Goldwater's political opponent, President Lyndon B. Johnson just before the 1964 election. Eliot alleges that Disney refused to lower the American flag at Disneyland after the assassination of John F. Kennedy.

The book also discusses the absence of a birth certificate for Walter Elias Disney and the possibility that Disney was actually born in 1890 to a peasant woman in Spain, then adopted by the Disney family alongside the possibility that Disney was later passed off as a full decade younger than he actually was. During that era, some birth certificates in various American states were never created or were lost or destroyed, so resolving this issue is impossible unless his body was exhumed and tested.

== Reception ==
The book has received sharp criticism from Walt Disney's wife Lillian Disney and daughter Diane Disney-Miller and some of the book's claims have been disputed by other authors. Miller claimed: "There are more than 150 glaring factual errors..." in Eliot's book. Former Disney animator David Hilberman - who was interviewed for the book - claimed Eliot had deliberately misquoted him.

Animation historian Michael Barrier, who collected interviews from over 150 of former Disney employees since 1969, claimed Eliot's book was "easily the worst Disney biography I've ever read. It is packed with errors and distortions. To rely upon Hollywood's Dark Prince in any way is exactly the opposite of meticulous". Barrier also noted that an analysis of the photo of Walt receiving the Presidential Medal of Freedom from US President Lyndon Johnson in 1964 showed that the object on his shirt may or may not have been a button showing support for the President's Republican opponent Barry Goldwater and was possibly "of something else". Though acknowledged that Walt supported Goldwater during the 1964 US presidential election and attended the Republican National Convention after Goldwater was nominated, the claim that he was wearing a Goldwater button has only been backed by accusations of a few people close to him and it was noted that Walt and President Johnson did in fact have a friendly conversation before he was given the Medal.

Disney historian Didier Ghez calls it on his website "...the latest and by far most stupid and uninteresting 'scandalous biography' of Walt. So full of mistakes, guesses, intentional lies and non-intentional ignorances it is hardly worth mentioning." Animation journalist Amid Amidi referred to it as a "notorious hack job."

== See also ==
- The Disney Version, the 1968 Richard Schickel book that is one of the first to be critical of Disney
- Walt Disney: An American Original, the 1976 biography by Bob Thomas
- Walt: The Man Behind the Myth, the 2001 documentary about Walt
