= Criticism of the Walt Disney Company =

Criticisms and controversies surrounding the Walt Disney Company

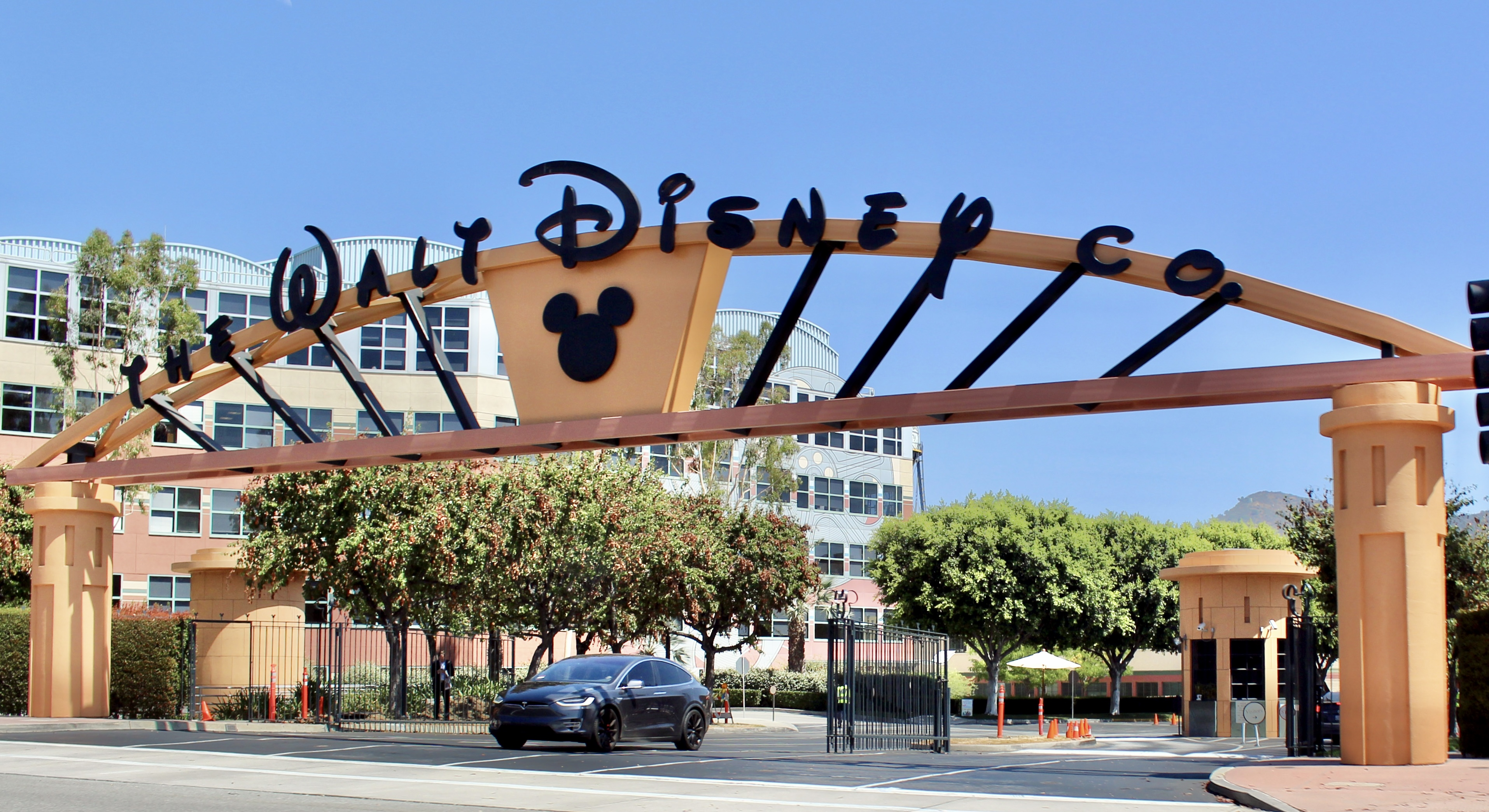
The entrance to Walt Disney Studios in Burbank, California, in July 2018

Criticism of the Walt Disney Company, one of the largest media corporations in the world, has included its business practices, executives, and content. The Walt Disney Studios has been criticized for including stereotypical portrayal of non-white characters, sexism, and alleged plagiarism. Several of Disney's business ventures, which include television networks, theme parks, and product lines, have also sparked controversy amongst groups of consumers and media outlets.

== Company officials and employees ==
=== Bob Iger ===
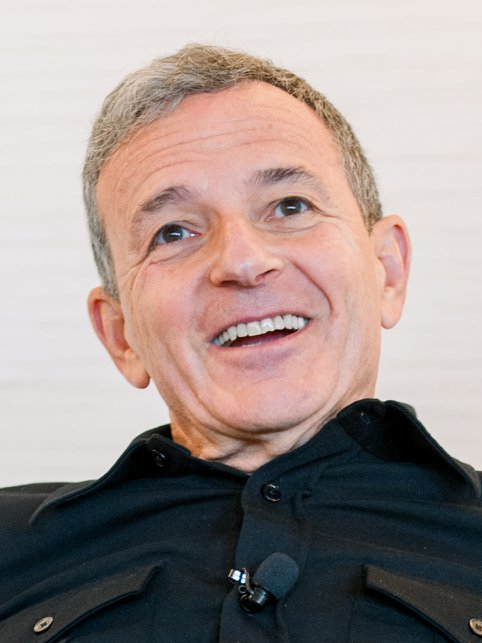
Walt Disney Company CEO Bob Iger in December 2022

In reaction to the 2023 SAG-AFTRA strike, Bob Iger, the CEO of The Walt Disney Company, said the actors' demands were "not realistic", adding they are "adding to the set of the challenges that this business is already facing". Iger has been criticized for these remarks in light of his contract with Disney allowing him to earn as much as $27 million for 2023 between his salary and bonuses. SAG-AFTRA president Fran Drescher called Iger's remarks "repugnant" and "tone deaf."

=== Brian Peck ===
Disney Channel faced backlash for hiring Brian Peck on the series The Suite Life of Zack & Cody after he had been convicted in 2004 for sexually abusing a minor in 2001, who has since been revealed to be former Nickelodeon star Drake Bell. Disney Channel executives fired Peck after learning about his conviction and Peck's voice lines and on-screen credits on the series were replaced or removed. Disney Channel representatives have stated that Peck was never on set nor interacted with the show's cast or crew.

== Disney Consumer Products ==
=== Disney Princess ===
On December 24, 2006, Peggy Orenstein published "What's Wrong With Cinderella?" in The New York Times. In her article, Orenstein discussed her concerns about the effects of princess figures on young girls. Orenstein used the Disney Princesses specifically to present many of her points. Orenstein also noted the pervasive nature of princess-related merchandise and that every facet of play has its princess equivalent.

Other sources have also voiced concern that the franchise could possibly give young girls the wrong message. However, other parents who have young daughters say that they would eventually grow out of this phase.

=== Marvel Comics ===
Page 16 of Captain America #602 (March 2010) depicted an anti-tax protest march in Idaho in which one participant held a sign reading "Tea Bag the Libs Before They Tea Bag You", with a caption containing the words of an off-screen African American superhero, the Falcon, telling Captain America, "I don't exactly see a black man from Harlem fitting in with a bunch of angry white folks." The cartoon drew the condemnation of Michael Johns, a board member of the Nationwide Tea Party Coalition.

Marvel Comics editor-in-chief Joe Quesada characterized the sign as inadvertent and as "something that we need to apologize for and own up to." Quesada explained that with a printing deadline looming, the comic's editor noticed that the protest group's signs on the original art were empty, and the editor "asked the letterer on the book to just fudge in some quick signs. The letterer in his rush ... looked on the 'net and started pulling slogans from actual signs", including a "Tea Bag" sign.

Following the issue's printing, Marvel staff "caught the mistake" and "spoke to the letterer, [who] was mortified at his mistake and was truly sorry as he had no political agenda." Quesada said Marvel "removed the sign from the art files so that it no longer appears in future reprints of the title or collections. So, while the crowd protesting has nothing to do with the villains in the story, we in no way meant to say they were associated with the Tea Party movement."

=== Star Wars ===
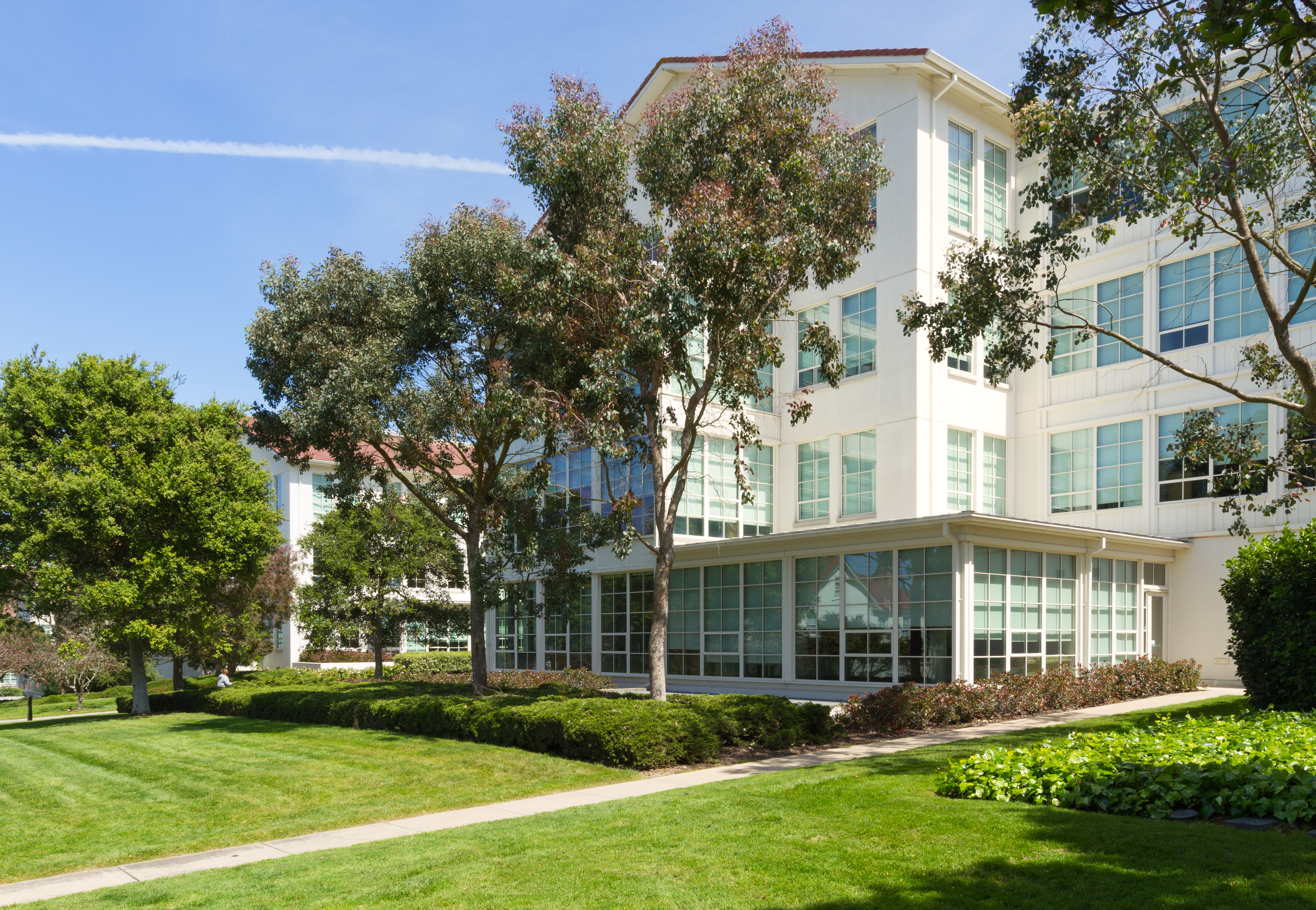
The headquarters of Lucasfilm in San Francisco in April 2015

On December 21, 2012, Disney acquired Lucasfilm, which included the rights to the Star Wars franchise, Skywalker Sound, and Industrial Light and Magic as a subsidiary for the price of $4 billion. Lucasfilm and Star Wars in general were evaluated to decide upon how each area was to be approached.

After Dark Horse Comics lost the rights to create Star Wars comics, in 2014, Marvel Comics gained the rights as a subsidiary in the area of expertise. With the elimination of the LucasArts developing arm, EA Games is being entrusted to make Star Wars video games in the future. The well-regarded animated TV series Star Wars: The Clone Wars was cancelled a few seasons from the end of its run, in order to shift the series' team to Star Wars Rebels, a new animated TV series created for Disney XD, set approximately five years before the events of Star Wars: Episode IV – A New Hope. They eventually revived Clone Wars for a final season.

== Disney General Entertainment Content ==
=== Disney Channel ===
Some critics disapprove of the Disney Channel marketing strategy led by Anne Sweeney, president of the Disney Channel from 1996 to 2014. Under Sweeney, the Disney Channel's programming was geared mainly towards preteen and teenage girls, with a decrease in animated programming. Criticism was also aimed at removing almost all Walt-era and pre-1990s material from the channel in 2002 with the removal of the late-night "Vault Disney" block devoted to this material, which used to make up the majority of the channel's programming since its inception in 1983. In 2008, Sweeney explained that Disney Channel, resulting from its multi-platform marketing strategy using television and music, would become "the major profit driver for the [Walt Disney] Company."

The channel has also pulled (and sometimes re-shot) episodes that have featured subject matter deemed inappropriate for its target audience, due either to humor or to timing of real-life events.

- In November 2008, the episode "No Sugar, Sugar" (Hannah Montana), in which Mitchel Musso's character, Oliver Oken, is revealed to have Type 1 diabetes, was pulled before its broadcast, due to parent complaints about its portrayal of diabetics and sugar intake. The episode was later revised with new scenes filmed after consulting with the diabetes research-funding organization JDRF; the updated version was aired during the program's third season on September 20, 2009 titled "Uptight (Oliver's Alright)".
- In December 2011, Disney Channel pulled episodes of two of its original series, due to complaints on Twitter from Demi Lovato about their portrayal of eating disorders. Pulled episodes included "Party It Up" (Shake It Up) and "Colbie Caillat" (So Random!). The former episode eventually began airing reruns regularly again on Disney Channel by removing dialogue deemed insensitive.
- In May 2013, Disney Channel pulled "Quitting Cold Koala" (Jessie) due to parental concerns over a scene in which a character's gluten-free diet leads to ridicule. The episode would eventually air with the scene replaced.
- In December 2017, Disney XD redubbed lines originally done by Louis C.K. for the Gravity Falls episode "Weirdmaggedon" due to the comedian admitting sexual misconduct following revelations published in The New York Times. C.K's lines were replaced by series creator Alex Hirsch according to a Disney Channel spokesperson.
- In December 2018, Disney Channel removed all Andi Mack episodes featuring the actor Stoney Westmoreland from circulation for sexually encountering a minor.
- In July 2024, multiple changes were made for the animated series Primos to emphasize that the show was set in Los Angeles and not in Latin America after its opening sequence received criticism on social media, largely from some Mexicans and other Latin-American communities.

=== ESPN ===
ESPN has also been accused of overpaying for sports broadcasting rights, and that Wall Street analysts have raised concerns that this could be a major drain on Disney as a whole, since the amount of money that can be recuperated from retransmission consent fees and advertising is limited; Disney still profits from the ESPN division but as of 2015 was cutting the network's higher-priced content to ensure long-term profitability. In October 2015, ESPN laid off about 300 employees, citing the rights costs combined with the increasing trend of cord-cutting.

In November 2019, ESPN's owner The Walt Disney Company launched the streaming service called Disney+. ESPN heavily promoted the Disney+ launch, leading to accusations that the network was sacrificing its journalistic integrity. Examples cited by critics included a Simpsons-themed edition of SportsCenter "Top 10", as well as NFL reporter Adam Schefter tweeting that Disney+ "will change lives". Writing in Slate, Laura Wagner said that the "tongue bath" for Disney+ "represents a new inflection point in ESPN's decline from journalistic institution to entertainment company". Wagner added "This clumsy marketing blitz is an embarrassing exercise that turns ostensible reporters into stooges. It's also a stark example of just how flimsy ESPN's editorial vision has become." Meanwhile, Kelly McBride of the nonprofit journalism organization the Poynter Institute in an interview with The Washington Post said "You're turning the journalist into a salesperson and asking them to upsell the product. That's not the relationship you want the journalist to have with the audience member. You want that relationship to be about trust in the journalist's expertise."

=== American Broadcasting Company ===
Over the years, ABC, a division of The Walt Disney Company, including ABC Daytime and ABC News, has faced criticism and controversy on a range of issues, including depicting a school shooting rampage, Ted Koppel reading names of the members of the United States Armed Forces who were killed in Iraq, a contract dispute, false credentials, the purchase of Freeform, suspension of Jimmy Kimmel, and guests hosted on The View. Separately, company officials and employees like Alexis Debat and Michael Eisner have been criticized, while ABC series Ellen and Nothing Sacred have been criticized by Christian religious organizations.

== Disney Entertainment ==
=== Hulu ===
==== Kardashian-Roblox scandal ====
The series premiere of The Kardashians, which debuted on April 14, 2022, titled "Burn Them All to the F*cking Ground", led to a public feud between Kim Kardashian and Roblox. In the episode, Kim's son Saint West shows his mother an experience on the platform from a tablet that depicts an image of Kim crying across the skybox and baseplate. She claimed, however, that the person who uploaded the experience had also obtained footage of her and Ray J's sex tape, and that she reacted by crying and claiming to later sue the company. Despite this allegation, the incident has been seen by many as a hoax, and was deceptively edited and staged as a way to cause uproar and false drama.

A spokesperson for Roblox responded by saying "The referenced video was never available on our platform. We have strict moderation and policies to protect our community, including zero tolerance for sexual content of any kind which violates our community rules." and "The text reference to the tape that got around our filters was quickly taken down and fortunately visible only to an extremely small number of people on the platform. We also swiftly took down the associated experience and banned the community developer involved with the incident." An individual close to the Kardashian family denied accusations of faking the event.

=== Disney+ ===
Several other Disney+ titles that had been earmarked for removal like A Spark Story, Marvel's MPower and Marvel's Voices Rising: The Music of Wakanda Forever stayed due a similar backlash.

== Disney Experiences ==
Over the years, Disney theme parks, under the Disney Experiences or more commonly known as Disney Parks, one of the three major divisions of the Walt Disney Company, have faced criticism and controversy on a range of issues, including animal cruelty at Disney's Animal Kingdom, overcrowding problems, and shark fin soup. Separately, Disneyland Resort has faced criticism for a ban on same-sex dancing from 1957 to 1989, Disney PhotoPass professional photography service, Hong Kong Disneyland Resort for fingerprinting visitors and food safety violations, and Walt Disney World Resort for a variety of issues.

== Walt Disney Studios ==
=== Miramax's handling of foreign films ===
Formerly a subsidiary of Disney from 1993 to 2010, Miramax came under criticism for its editing, dubbing, and replacing the soundtracks of various foreign films that it released. One notable example is Iron Monkey which, though released subtitled, had its subtitles altered to remove the political context of the story; had scenes trimmed and changed for violence and pacing; and had the soundtrack changed, removing the famous Wong Fei Hung theme. Other films that they have altered in this way include Shaolin Soccer; Farewell My Concubine (theatrical release); The Thief and the Cobbler; and Jet Li's Fist of Legend. Peter Biskind's book Down and Dirty Pictures details many of the Weinsteins' dishonest dealings with filmmakers. Under the Weinsteins, Miramax had a history of buying the rights to Asian films, only to sit on them without releasing them for years. One example of this is Hero, a 2002 Chinese martial arts film. It languished in Miramax's vaults for two years before it was salvaged with the intervention of Quentin Tarantino, the Government of China and even Disney's executives. Another example is Tears of the Black Tiger, a Thai film originally released in 2000. After changing the film's ending, Tears of the Black Tiger sat in Miramax's vaults for five years until its rights were purchased by Magnolia Pictures in 2006, where the film was released unedited. December 3, 2010, Disney closed the sale of Miramax for US$663 million to Filmyard Holdings.

=== Use of purebred dogs in film ===
Disney has been criticized for using purebred dogs in movies such as 101 Dalmatians. Animal rights groups claim movies with purebreds create an artificial demand for purebreds from people who may not be prepared or temperamentally suited for the animals, many of whom end up abandoned or surrendered to animal shelters or rescue groups.

=== Filming in Xinjiang ===
In 2020, Disney was criticised for filming in the autonomous region of Xinjiang, where human rights abuses are taking place, and thanking the publicity department of the Xinjiang Uyghur Autonomous Region Chinese Communist Party Committee and the public security bureau in Turpan in the credits of the live-action remake of Mulan. In a statement released, Disney said it was not responsible for the credit and attributed it to a 3rd party involved in the filming. The public security bureau in Turpan was added to the U.S. Bureau of Industry and Security's Entity List in October 2019.

=== October 7 attacks ===
In October 2023, The Walt Disney Company pledged $2 million for humanitarian relief efforts in Israel, following a series of attacks by the militant group Hamas. Disney allocated half of this donation to Magen David Adom, Israel's national emergency medical service, and the other half to various non-profit organizations supporting children in Israel. Disney CEO Bob Iger condemned the attacks and described the donation as a means of supporting innocent people in Israel, particularly children. In addition to the $2 million, Disney implemented a matching gift program for employees up to $25,000. The move sparked backlash from Muslim audiences and critics, who argued that there is a lack of parity and concern given to Palestinians in the conflict, especially given the death of thousands of Palestinians, including children.

=== Marvel Studios Layoffs ===
In April 2026, The Walt Disney Company announced a new round of layoffs which impacted over 1,000 employees at the company, a Disney spokesperson stated that the layoffs are "a plan to consolidate marketing at the film, TV and streaming operations and eliminate duplication". One of the most affected units was Marvel Studios in both Burbank and New York across its several film and television productions, more specific its visual development department for several Marvel Studios films. The announcement was met with blackash arguing that the people that got fired were responsible for the box-office success of multiple Marvel Studios films. Actress Evangeline Lilly which played the character Hope Van Dyne/Wasp in multiple movies called out Disney for the layoffs, her statements where “Where are the laws that REMOVE all human art from the AI bank?!?. Why do they get to steal our brilliance and use it to make executives rich while the artists responsible for feeding their robots go hungry?? Disgusting. California lawmakers...where are you?!?!?”.

=== Pixar Layoffs ===
In July 2026, The Walt Disney Company announced a third round of layoffs across ABC News, ESPN and Pixar Animation Studios. One of the most affected divisions was Pixar with a 10% of staff members being affected. According to The Wrap, some company members blamed the layoffs on the "poor box-office performance" of Hoppers and the studio focusing more on theatrical releases rather than streaming content. The announcement was met with backlash arguing that both Hoppers and Toy Story 5 lead Disney's box-office in 2026 as opposed to other Disney releases from the year, more specific with The Mandalorian and Grogu and Moana (2026) which where box-office disappointments. Other criticism is using Hoppers as a scapegoat for the layoffs arguing that the movie did well at the box-office and streaming as the film has constantly ranking high at streaming charts like Nielsen.

== Walt Disney Company ==
=== 21st Century Fox acquisition ===
On December 14, 2017, Disney agreed to acquire 21st Century Fox's motion picture business, cable and direct satellite entertainment networks, that was completed on March 20, 2019. Under the terms of the agreement, Disney acquired the 20th Century Fox film and television studios and related assets; cable and satellite networks including FX Networks, Fox Networks Group; Indian television broadcasting company Star India; stakes in National Geographic Partners and Hulu, and other assets. Prior to the completion of the deal, Fox spun-off its news and broadcast businesses, including Fox News, Fox Business, FS1, FS2, Fox Deportes, and the Big Ten Network, the Fox Broadcasting Company, and MyNetworkTV into the newly formed Fox Corporation.

This merger was subject to widespread criticism among critics, consumers, and businesses due to antitrust concerns. One of the biggest concerns is that unlike Disney's acquisition of Pixar, Marvel Entertainment, and Lucasfilm, the Disney/Fox deal was a horizontal integration (in which a company owns a direct competitor) in contrast to a vertical integration (in which two companies operate different stages for a specific finished product) like the mergers of AT&T-Time Warner and Comcast-NBCUniversal. Given Disney's already powerful box market shares, a combined Disney/Fox would give it a 39% theatrical market share and would strengthen Disney's already leveraging power over theater owners in its favor without regard to the negative effects on their businesses.

=== Blue Sky Studios shutdown ===
Ownership of Blue Sky Studios was assumed by The Walt Disney Company as part of the acquisition of 21st Century Fox. Two years later on February 9, 2021, Disney announced that it was closing Blue Sky Studios that April after 35 years of existence. A PR spokesperson for the company explained that in light of the COVID-19 pandemic's continued economic impact on all of the company's businesses, it was no longer sustainable for them to run a third in-house brick and mortar feature animation studio. This included the studio's film library and intellectual properties retained by Disney and that Blue Sky's operations would before folded into 20th Century Animation. In addition, production on the film adaptation of the webcomic Nimona was canceled with other future films in development or early in production.

On April 11, 2022, it was announced that Annapurna Pictures had picked up Nimona earlier in the year, and would be releasing it on Netflix in 2023. DNEG Animation was announced as the project's animation partner, and the film would end up being nominated for the Academy Award for Best Animated Feature. The decision to close down Blue Sky was criticized.

== Labor practices ==
=== Sweatshop controversies ===
Disney has been accused of human rights violations regarding the working conditions in factories that produce their merchandise.

In 1996, the New York-based National Labor Committee released a 12-page report that severely criticized Sears, Walmart, and The Walt Disney Company. "Haitian contractors producing Mickey Mouse and Pocahontas pajamas for U.S. companies under license with the Walt Disney Corporation are in some cases paying workers as little as 15 gourdes (US$1) per day–12 cents an hour– in clear violation of Haitian law," said the NLC. One factory owner testified that workers underperform because they cannot eat enough. Besides living on starvation wages, Haitian factory workers face sexual harassment and exceptionally long working days. The report claimed it would take a seamstress 1,040 years to earn what then-CEO Michael Eisner earned in one day.

In 2012, the Institute for Global Labour and Human Rights released the report "Toys From Hell". It describes how workers at Dream International factory in Shenzhen, China work 117-hour weeks in a filthy, hot, ratty environment where they are constantly screamed at by supervisors, and only earn $1.39 per hour. The report also describes workers as expected to lodge in dirty and overcrowded dormitories, where they are served below-par food. The Dream International factory was also considered to be a fire hazard.

=== Collusion to replace employees with H-1B holders ===
In January 2016, two former employees filed suit against Disney, HCL Technologies, and Cognizant, alleging the companies broke the law by colluding to bring in holders of H-1B visas to replace American workers. In October 2016, federal Judge Gregory A. Presnell of the United States District Court in Orlando dismissed the lawsuits, stating: "none of the allegedly false statements put at issue in the complaint are adequate".

== Copyright enforcement ==
=== Copyright extension ===
From 1990 to 2024, The Walt Disney Company had lobbied for copyright extension. The Copyright Term Extension Act delayed the entry into the public domain of the earliest Mickey Mouse movies, leading detractors to nickname it "The Mickey Mouse Protection Act". Opponents of the legislation consider it to be corporate welfare and have unsuccessfully tried to have it declared unconstitutional, claiming that such an act is not "necessary and proper" to accomplishing the Constitution's stated purpose of "promot[ing] the progress of science and useful arts". They argue that, since most works bring the majority of their profits during the first few years after publication, extending the terms of copyrights provides little economic incentive except to a few owners of wildly-successful franchises.

=== Copyright violation trial ===
Disney later faced legal criticism from Rearden LLC, which sued Disney after it was alleged that Disney used its MOVA Contour software without permission. On December 21, 2023, a US jury based in Oakland ordered for Disney to pay Rearden $600,000 in copyright damages after finding that the software was used to render the face of the Beast in the 2017 remake of Beauty and the Beast. However, this was considered to be a minimal payout, as Rearden sought $100 million in damages and alleged the software was used without permission for more films, including Guardians of the Galaxy and multiple Avengers installments.

== Miscellaneous criticisms and complaints ==
=== South Park controversy ===
The Jonas Brothers and Disney Channel are parodied in the South Park episode entitled "The Ring" and play a prominent role in the episode's plot. In a television column written before "The Ring" aired, Lisa de Moraes of The Washington Post suggested that creators Trey Parker and Matt Stone were using the Jonas Brothers in the 13th season debut as a means of improving the show's ratings; Comedy Central executives, however, insisted that the Jonas Brothers fans do not fit into South Park's demographic of males aged from 18 to 49.

The Walt Disney Company, Disney Channel and the Mickey Mouse cartoon character are also prominently featured and spoofed in the episode; even when Mickey Mouse says callous things or physically assaults people, he follows up most statements with the character's trademark high-pitched "Ha ha!" laugh, which in context comes off like a nervous tic.

Reviewers and commentators have described "The Ring" as not just a parody of the Jonas Brothers, but also of the ethos of The Walt Disney Company. The episode portrays Disney as a corporation using the ruse of family-friendly morals to disguise their primary motive, which is profit; reviewers and articles said this point is further illustrated by the use of Mickey Mouse, a cartoon symbol for the wholesome Disney image, as a foul-mouthed, contemptuous, greedy, all-powerful and violent character.

Due to other speculation on the orientation and personal activities of the Jonas brothers, the episode continued to create a running gag on the effect of the Jonas brothers on young girls of the "tween" period, often provoking the image that they too would become like Mickey Mouse, in most unwanted characteristics. The episode further illustrates the greed of corporate culture by portraying Mickey as capitalizing on religion for profit, while secretly mocking it in a particularly cruel tone: "Even the Christians are too fucking stupid to figure out I'm selling sex to their daughters! I've made billions off of Christian ignorance for decades now! And do you know why? Because Christians are retarded! They believe in a talking dead guy!"

=== Funding of Florida's Parental Rights in Education Act ===
In late February 2022, it was reported that Disney donated an estimated $200,000 to sponsors and cosponsors of Florida's Parental Rights in Education Act (known by its critics as the Don't Say Gay law). On March 7, 2022, Disney CEO Bob Chapek said that the company would not take a public stance on the bill, focusing instead on effecting change through its content. After criticism of their stance by those affiliated with Disney, including the company's employees, Disney affirmed that they would challenge the bill. In a possible act of retaliation, Florida Governor Ron DeSantis and Florida lawmakers threatened to repeal the 1967 Reedy Creek Improvement Act, which established the area surrounding the Walt Disney World Resort, the Reedy Creek Improvement District, as its own city. On April 22, 2022, DeSantis signed a bill to dissolve the Reedy Creek Improvement District by June 2023.

== See also ==
- Criticism of ESPN
- List of incidents at Disney parks
- Walt Disney: Hollywood's Dark Prince
