= Joel Goodman =

American film score composer

Joel Goodman is an American film score composer and recording artist. He is the founder of Museum Music, MusicBox, and Hi-Fi Productions. In 2023 he released the album An Exquisite Moment.

== Early life and education ==
Goodman was born in Brooklyn, NY and grew up in Queens, where he learned to play his first instrument (the trumpet) from public school music educator Allen Stier. He attended high school in Manhattan at The High School of Music & Art, where he played trumpet in the orchestra, and wrote arrangements and played bass for his high school jazz band. In the summer before his final year, Goodman attended the Berklee College of Music summer program.

Goodman attended the Berklee College of Music as a double major focusing on both bass performance and jazz composition and arranging. During this time those he studied under included Herb Pomeroy, Michael Gibbs, Bob Freedman, John LaPorta, Gary Burton, John Abercrombie, Jerry Bergonzi, Steve Swallow and Bruce Gertz. Goodman was also the bass player in the first Tower of Power ensemble at the college.

Goodman was also a member of the jazz/world/fusion band Ananda founded by composer and guitarist Claudio Ragazzi. Their first album, titled Amazonia, was recorded for the record label Sonic Atmospheres and was produced by Craig Huxley.

== Film and TV scoring career ==
After graduating from Berklee in 1984, Goodman moved back to New York City and began his music career as a live and studio session bassist. In 1992 he became a staff composer for the music production house North Forty Music where he composed music for national television advertisements. Goodman worked at North Forty Music until 1999, when he left to pursue composing for film full-time.

Goodman's first score was for a documentary film called My Knees Were Jumping, came about by a chance meeting with an old high school friend on the streets of New York City. The film premiered at the Sundance Film Festival in 1996 and opened the door for many more film scoring opportunities to come.

While the music was being mixed into the film prior to its release, another film producer in the studio next door came in to inquire about the music, and this ultimately led to Goodman's next scoring project. Green Chimneys premiered at the Sundance Film Festival the following year. He was then the composer for the documentary Concert of Wills: Building the Getty Center.

Goodman has since gone on to score over 150 films and TV shows, and has collaborated with many distinguished directors and producers including Neil LaBute, Albert Maysles, Andrew Jarecki, Barbara Kopple, Wong Kar-wai, Rachel Grady, Marshall Curry, Sebastian Junger, Barak Goodman, Alexandra Pelosi, Michael Epstein, Joe Berlinger, Oren Jacoby, Irene Taylor Brodsky, Lesli lwerks, and Fisher Stevens. More than 40 of the films were broadcast on HBO/Max, and he is the composer of the theme song for the PBS series American Experience as well as the scores for several television series on A&E, Amazon, Netflix, and ESPN. In description of his music, Justin Lowe of The Hollywood Reporter called his work on the film Being Elmo an “energetic, fanciful score”.

In 2012, Goodman received an Emmy Award in recognition of his score to the HBO film Saving Pelican #895. The award was presented as part of the 33rd Annual News & Documentary Emmy Awards in the category of Outstanding Individual Achievement in a Craft: Music & Sound. As of 2023, Goodman has received 4 Emmy nominations his scores, with one win, and has worked on films that earned five Oscar nominations, 30 Emmy awards, and more than 40 Emmy nominations.

== Music labels ==
Goodman founded Museum Music, that has produced albums in conjunction with institutions such as the Museum of Modern Art in NYC. The Wall Street Journal described one of their early albums Jackson Pollock’s Jazz, as “indeed a connoisseur's selection, both a superior introduction to jazz fundamentals for an initiate as well as a return to past pleasures for experienced jazz listeners“. Other museums Goodman’s label has created concept albums for include Metropolitan Museum of Art, the Museum of Modern Art, the Museum of Fine Art, Boston, the J. Paul Getty Museum, the Detroit Institute of Arts, the High Museum of Art, the American Museum of Natural History, and the National Gallery, London. In 2001 Goodman co-founded MusicBox with Daniel Stein, which was later acquired by Ole Music Publishing in 2011. MusicBox was the administrator and owner of approximately 24,000 songs from the catalogues of sublabels including Deep East Music, Gourd Music, Hella Good Records, Cue, Urban States of America, Private Reserve, Spider Cues, Tread, Vibey Library, Boombox, Camaleon, Epic, Music For Sport, Icon, Ultraphonic, Roar and Hens Teeth Music.

Goodman is also the cofounder of Icon Trailer Music, and through his production company Hi-Fi Productions, Goodman created 4 production music catalogs that are distributed by Universal Music Publishing. He also cofounded the company Storyteller through the firm. He is also the founder of Oovra Music, which licenses the compositions of others to documentary films, advertising, and non-broadcast programs. Goodman has served on the board of the Production Music Association, where he is the Chairman of the Performing Rights Committee.

== An Exquisite Moment ==
In 2023, Goodman released his debut album, An Exquisite Moment, playing keyboards and bass with Donny McCaslin (saxophones), Eric Harland (drums), Adam Rogers (guitar), Mino Cinélu (percussion), and Scott Colley (bass). The album features performances from Randy Brecker (flugelhorn, trumpet), Brandee Younger (harp), Lisa Fischer (vocals), John Patitucci (bass), and Philippe Saisse (piano, vibes, marimba).

Abe Beeson of NPR said of the album that, “Working with expert improvisational musicians means that each performance is a unique moment that will never be repeated. Goodman’s new album collects multiple “exquisite” moments that reveal themselves with repeated listens.” The album has been referred to as ““full experience” music”, and Keith Black of the Winnipeg Free Press called the work “terrifically inventive … a sometimes hard-edged romp that is very satisfying.”

== Personal life ==
Goodman is a native New Yorker, who moved to Los Angeles in 2003. Goodman conducts university master classes in the US and Europe, including American Film Institute, USC, Berklee College of Music – Boston & Valencia, University of North Texas, AFI Docs, The Academy of Music and Dramatic Arts in Denmark, and Columbia College Chicago. He has also served as a panelist for such organizations as ASCAP, IFP, AFI and SCL.

== Credits ==
=== Discography ===
Beginning in 1996, Goodman produced four records for Chesky Records.

| Year | Artist | Album title | Label |
|---|---|---|---|
| 1996 | I Ching | Of the Marsh and the Moon | Chesky Records |
| 1997 | Livingston Taylor | Ink | Chesky Records |
| 1999 | Carla Lother | Ephemera | Chesky Records |
| 2000 | Chuck Mangione | Everything For Love | Chesky Records |

== See also ==
- Walt Disney (2015 PBS film)
