= Harvey and the Wallbangers =

UK jazz vocal harmony group

- Origin: Cambridge, England
- Genres: Jazz; doo-wop; blues rock
- Years active: 1980–1987
- Members: Jeremy Taylor; Jonny Griffiths; Harvey Brough; Neil "Reg" McArthur; Christopher Purves; Richard Allen
- Past members: Andrew Huggett

Harvey and the Wallbangers were an English jazz vocal harmony group during the 1980s, playing major festivals and the main concert halls in the UK and elsewhere in Europe, such as the Royal Albert Hall, Sadler's Wells, The Forum, Ronnie Scotts and the Berlin Tempodrom. The group also appeared on the Royal Variety Show and scores of other television programmes including Wogan, Russell Harty and Carrott's Lib.

Harvey and the Wallbangers recorded four albums on their own label (Hubbadots) and also The Jazz Album with Simon Rattle (EMI).

== Band members ==
- Jeremy Taylor – Vocals, trombone, trumpet, percussion
- Harvey Brough – Vocals, saxes, organ, cor anglais, percussion
- Christopher Purves – Vocals, trumpet, percussion
- Jonny Griffiths – Vocals, Guitar, violin, phonofiddle, percussion, ukulele
- Neil "Reg" McArthur – Vocals, piano, guitar, harpsichord, melodica, percussion
- Richard Allen – Vocals, double bass, percussion
- Andrew Huggett – Drums

== Early band members ==
- Paul Daniel – Vocals
- Russell Watson – Bass Vocals
- Brian Shelley – Vocals
- Peter Stephens – Piano
- Chris Cox – Bass

== Stage shows ==
Each year the Wallbangers would put together a new stage show, normally premiered at the Edinburgh Festival (the only time they missed performing in Edinburgh was 1985). The shows were produced by a selection of inspiring Directors.

Performance Year	Show Name	Director
1983	Hep Cats Go Ape	Jude Kelly (Royal National Theatre)
1984	Allez Bananes	Rod Natkiel
1985	Like men Possessed	James Runcie (TV series Grantchester)
1986	Park the Tiger	David Gilmore (Daisy Pulls It Off)

== Radio Series ==
On 26 June 1985, the Wallbangers appeared on BBC Radio 2 (at 22.15) for the first of a series of six 15-minute Wednesday night shows of "music & mirth". The series was produced by Paul Mayhew-Archer and featured additional material by comedy writer James Hendrie. The short series was repeated again in April the following year.

This was followed in 1987, when the Wallbangers had their own half-hour Tuesday night radio show on BBC Radio 2. Produced again by Paul Mayhew-Archer and written by James Hendrie, the series ran for 6 episodes, hosting a number of special guest celebrities.

Episode No.	Original Air Date	Guests
Episode 1	20 January 1987	Jeremy Hardy, Roger McGough, Pete McCarthy.
Episode 2	27 January 1987	Paul Merton, John Irwin.
Episode 3	3 February 1987	John Dowie, Nick Revell.
Episode 4	10 February 1987	Jeremy Hardy, Roger McGough, Pete McCarthy.
Episode 5	17 February 1987	Norman Lovett, John Dowie.
Episode 6	24 February 1987	Paul Merton, John Irwin.

In 1986 the band also provided music for an adaptation of Dario Fo's Archangels broadcast on BBC Radio 3.

== Dissolution ==
After Griffiths left the band, the band decided to break up after a final tour. The band performed with Simon Rattle and the London Sinfonietta, later released on Rattle's Jazz Album.

The final show, on Sunday 3 May 1987, was originally booked at the Duke of York's Theatre in the West End, but having sold out in just a morning, it was finally moved to the Sadler's Wells Theatre in Clerkenwell, London, where the Wallbangers performed for the last time.

Stephen Grater (the band's manager for the past four years) had contracted a brain tumor, and died a few days before the final concert. According to Purves, this partly inspired the band members to stop.

== Discography ==
Album Cover	Album Title	Album Details	Tracks
	Allez Bananes	Released: 1984; Recorded: Gateway Studios, Battersea; Engineer: Pascal Gabriel; Produced: Rex Brough & Harvey Brough	(1) Five Guy's Named Moe, (2) Who Do You Know in Heaven, (3) My Baby's Gone, (4) Jailhouse Rock, (5) Shine, (6) Your Feet's Too Big, (7) I'll Be Forever Loving You, (8) Boogie Nights, (9) Sweet Talkin' Guy, (10) Sixteen Tons, (11) Traffic Jam, (12) Nutrocker, (13) Right Next Door to An Angel, (14) Sh Boom, (15) Blue Skies.
	Wallbangers A – GoGo	Released: 1985; Recorded: Gateway Studios, Battersea; Engineer: Pascal Gabriel; Produced: Rex Brough & Harvey Brough	(1) Make Your Mind Up, (2) Lets Make It Today, (3) Sea Cruise, (4) Ain't Nobody Here But Us Chickens, (5) Breakaway, (6) The Falling Rain, (7) Someday Soon Somehow, (8) Needle in a Haystack, (9) Anything (You Want Me To Do), (10) 523 423, (11) Sometimes Ali, (12) Got The Woo-Woos, (13) Cool Dog, (14) Every Second Every Minute Every Hour of Every Day (I Need Your Love).
	Park The Tiger (EP)	Released: 1986; Recorded: Hollywood Studios, London; Engineer: – Olly Hitch; Produced: Harvey Brough & Olly Hitch	(1) I Ain't Got You, (2) Tons & Tons of Sunshine, (3) Dancing in the Ballroom, (4) Devil Went Down To Georgia, (5) Like I Should.
	Someday Soon Somehow	Released: 1987; Recorded: BBC Paris Studios, London W1; Engineer: John Whitehall; Produced: Paul Mayhew-Archer, Jo Cooke & Harvey Brough	(1) Here Comes Leroy, (2) We're Heading for the Poorhouse, (3) False Alarm, (4) Traffic Jam, (5) Baby Don't Drink, (6) Out of the Shadows, (7) The Concept, (8) Inflation Blues, (9) I Think You're Something Else, (10) Sometimes I Feel like A Motherless Child, (11) Marie, (12) Occapella, (13) Cool Jerk, (14) Let Me Down, (15) Life Is Easy, (16) Since I Don't Have You, (17) Lipstick Traces on a Cigarette, (18) High School Confidential, (19) Who's Fooling Who? (20) Someday Soon Somehow, (21) Breaths.
	Simon Rattle Jazz Album	Released: 1987; Recorded: CTS Studios, Wembley; Conductor: Simon Rattle & London Sinfonietta; Produced: EMI Records Ltd	(3) After You've Gone, (8) Sweet Sue, (10) Makin' Whoopee!, (11) My Blue Heaven.
	Final Concert	Released: 1987; Recorded: Live at the Sadler's Wells Theatre; Date: Sunday 3 May 1987	
	Early Days	Remastering of 'Allez Bananas' with some added out-takes; Released: 2004; Recorded: Gateway Studios, Battersea; Engineer: Pascal Gabriel; Produced: Rex Brough & Harvey Brough	(1) Five Guy's Named Moe, (2) Who Do You Know in Heaven, (3) My Baby's Gone, (4) Jailhouse Rock, (5) Shine, (6) Your Feet's Too Big, (7) I'll Be Forever Loving You, (8) Boogie Nights, (9) Sweet Talkin' Guy, (10) Sixteen Tons, (11) Traffic Jam, (12) Nutrocker, (13) Right Next Door to An Angel, (14) Sh Boom, (15) Blue Skies, (16) Glad To Be Here, (17) Paper Moon, (18) Deacon Jones, (19) Atom & Evil, (20) Mr Paganini, (21) Old Man River, (22) Don't You Worry 'bout A Thing, (23) Sunny Side of the Street.

== Post-Wallbangers careers ==
Christopher Purves, who left the band due to the pressures of touring, trained as an operatic baritone and his first major role was in Inés de Castro by James MacMillan in 1997. He also played the lead roles in Alban Berg's Wozzeck and Verdi's Falstaff, Beckmesser in Wagner's Meistersinger, Tonio in Leoncavallo's Pagliacci and Balstrode in Britten's Peter Grimes. He also sang in a television commercial for fruit drink Um Bongo.

Harvey Brough followed the dissolution by scoring John Godber's Shakers with his brother Rex, providing what the Times described as "blues, country and Bananarama-ish tunes". But like Purves, he later went in a more serious direction, including composing and performing Requiem in Blue, a composition with elements of jazz, folk, and classical music, in tribute to his dead brother. He was married to jazz singer Jacqui Dankworth.

== Harvey and the "New" Wallbangers ==
The members of the band worked together occasionally after the split. Harvey Brough was joined by the reunited Wallbangers for a 2004 concert at the Usher Hall in Edinburgh.

In 2016 Clara Sanabras asked Harvey to reform the Wallbangers to appear on one song (Travellers Never Did Lie) on her album "A Hum About Mine Ears". The CD was launched at the Barbican, London in March 2016, by Clara with the new Harvey and The Wallbangers, Britten Sinfonia, Jacqueline Shave, Violin and two choirs – Chorus of Dissent and Harvey's Vox Holloway conducted by Harvey.

In 2017, after a 30-year hiatus, three of the original Wallbangers (Harvey Brough, Jeremy Taylor & Richard Allen) plus two new Wallbangers (Clara Sanabras & Naomi Hammerton) decided to reform the band. They were joined by a rhythm section Andy Hamill and Roy Dodds to perform in three sold-out gigs in London and Southampton, followed by an appearance at the Bury St Edmunds music festival.

At the London shows the Wallbangers were joined on stage by original pianist "Reg Prescott", for the song Blue Skies.

== Film and TV ==
Show Title	Program Details
Six Fifty-Five	Released: Tuesday 9 August 1983; Channel: BBC 2; Cast: Lenny Henry; Editor: Peter Hercombe; Songs: Stranded in the Jungle & Right next door to an Angel
At Last -It's 1984!	Released: Sunday 1 January 1984 (New Year Show); Channel: BBC 1; Cast: Michael Barrymore; Director: Bach Tony; Songs : Schboom & Paper Moon
Folio – TV Arts Show	Released: 1984; Channel: Anglian TV; Cast: Paul Barnes; Songs : Grazing in the grass, Allez bananes, Who put the Bomp, Schboom, Nobody, Ain't nobody here but us chickens, Sea Cruise, Boogie Nights
Royal Variety Performance	Released: Sunday 25 November 1984 – Victoria Palace Theatre; Channel: BBC 1; Cast: Various; Musical Director: Ronnie Hazelhurst; Songs : Who put the Bomp & William Tell
Cabaret (TV series)	Released: Wednesday 6 February 1985; Channel: BBC 2; Cast: Robyn Archer, Bertice Reading, Rory Bremner; Director: Philip Chilvers
The Laughter Show (TV series)	Released: Saturday 2 March 1985 – (repeated Thursday 25 July 1985); Channel: BBC 1; Cast: Les Dennis and Dustin Gee with Slither Spook and Roy Jay; Director: John Bishop
The Laughter Show (TV series)	Released: Saturday 23 March 1985 – (repeated Thursday 29 August 1985); Channel: BBC 1; Cast: Les Dennis and Dustin Gee with Greg Rodgers; Director: John Bishop
Kelly's Eye	Released: 1985 – 6 episodes; Channel: TVS (Television South); Cast: Matthew Kelly; Songs: 523423, Someday soon somehow, Needle in a Haystack, Cool Dog, Falling Rain, Breakaway
Summertime Special	Released: Saturday 26 July 1986; Channel: TVS (Television South); Cast: Randy Crawford
Minstrel of the Dawn	Released: Monday 21 March 1988; Channel: BBC 1; Cast: Mary O'Hara; Director: Alan Tongue

== See also ==
- Harvey Wallbanger
- Harvey's Wallbangers
