= Peter Stephan Jungk =

American German language writer

Peter Stephan Jungk (born December 19, 1952, in Santa Monica, California) is an American German-language novelist.

== Life ==
Jungk is the son of futurologist Robert Jungk. He grew up in the United States and after 1957 in Vienna. From 1968 to 1970 he attended the Rudolf-Steiner-School in Berlin. He lived in Salzburg from 1970 till he took his Matura in 1972. In 1973 Jungk worked with the theater of Basel as an assistant director. From 1974 to 1976 he studied at the American Film Institute in Los Angeles.

From 1976 to 1979 he lived in Salzburg again. In 1979 he worked with Peter Handke on filming Handke's The Left-Handed Woman (Die linkshändige Frau) as an assistant director. In 1980 Jungk attended a Torah school in Jerusalem. He moved back to Vienna in 1981. Since 1988 he has been living in Paris with his wife, photographer Lillian Birnbaum. In 1994 their daughter Adah Dylan was born.

Jungk is an author of novels, essays and scripts. In some cases he also directed the movie version of his own works. Besides that he translates from English.

In January 2013 the opera The Perfect American by Philip Glass, based on Jungk's novel Der König von Amerika, premiered at the Teatro Real in Madrid.

Jungk is a member of the Austrian PEN Club.

== Awards ==
- 2001: Stephan Andres Prize
- 2011: Buchpreis der Salzburger Wirtschaft

== Publications ==
=== As author ===
- Stechpalmenwald. Frankfurt am Main 1978
- Rundgang. Frankfurt am Main 1981
- Franz Werfel, Frankfurt am Main 1987; translated as Franz Werfel: A Life in Prague, Vienna and Hollywood (1990)
- Tigor. Frankfurt am Main 1991
- Vier Frauen. Heidelberg 1994 (with Lillian Birnbaum)
- Die Unruhe der Stella Federspiel. Munich 1996
- Die Erbschaft. (The Inheritance) Munich 1999
- Der König von Amerika. (The Perfect American) Stuttgart 2001
- Die Reise über den Hudson (Crossing the Hudson) Stuttgart 2005
- Das elektrische Herz (The electric heart), Vienna 2011
- Die Dunkelkammern der Edith Tudor-Hart – Geschichten eines Lebens (The dark rooms of Edith Tudor Hart – a life's stories), Frankfurt, 2015

=== As editor ===
- Das Franz-Werfel-Buch, Frankfurt am Main 1986

=== As translator ===
- Woody Allen: Gott. Frankfurt am Main 1989
- Christopher Durang: Betty, Boo und die Ehe. Frankfurt am Main 1987
- Christopher Durang: Gebrüllt vor Lachen. Frankfurt am Main 1989
- Raymond Fitzsimons: Edmund Kean. Frankfurt am Main 1987
- Gabriel Gbadamosi: Hotel Orpheu. Frankfurt am Main 1994
- Thornton Wilder: Bei Shakespeare und in der Bibel. Frankfurt am Main 1999
- Thornton Wilder: Es läutet an der Tür. Frankfurt am Main 1999
- Thornton Wilder: Jugend. Frankfurt am Main 1999
- Thornton Wilder: Unterirdische Flußläufe. Frankfurt am Main 1999

== Documentaries ==
- Franz Werfel – Ein Weltfreund zwischen den Welten (ZDF/ORF, 1988)
- Leo Perutz – Der Meister der Nacht (ZDF/ORF, 1989)
- Evgen Bavčar – Dunkles Licht (ZDF/ORF, 1992)
- André Previn – Eine Brücke zwischen den Welten (Dor-Film, 2008)
- Tracking Edith (peartree-entertainment, 2016)
