= Zachary James =

American actor and singer (born 1981)

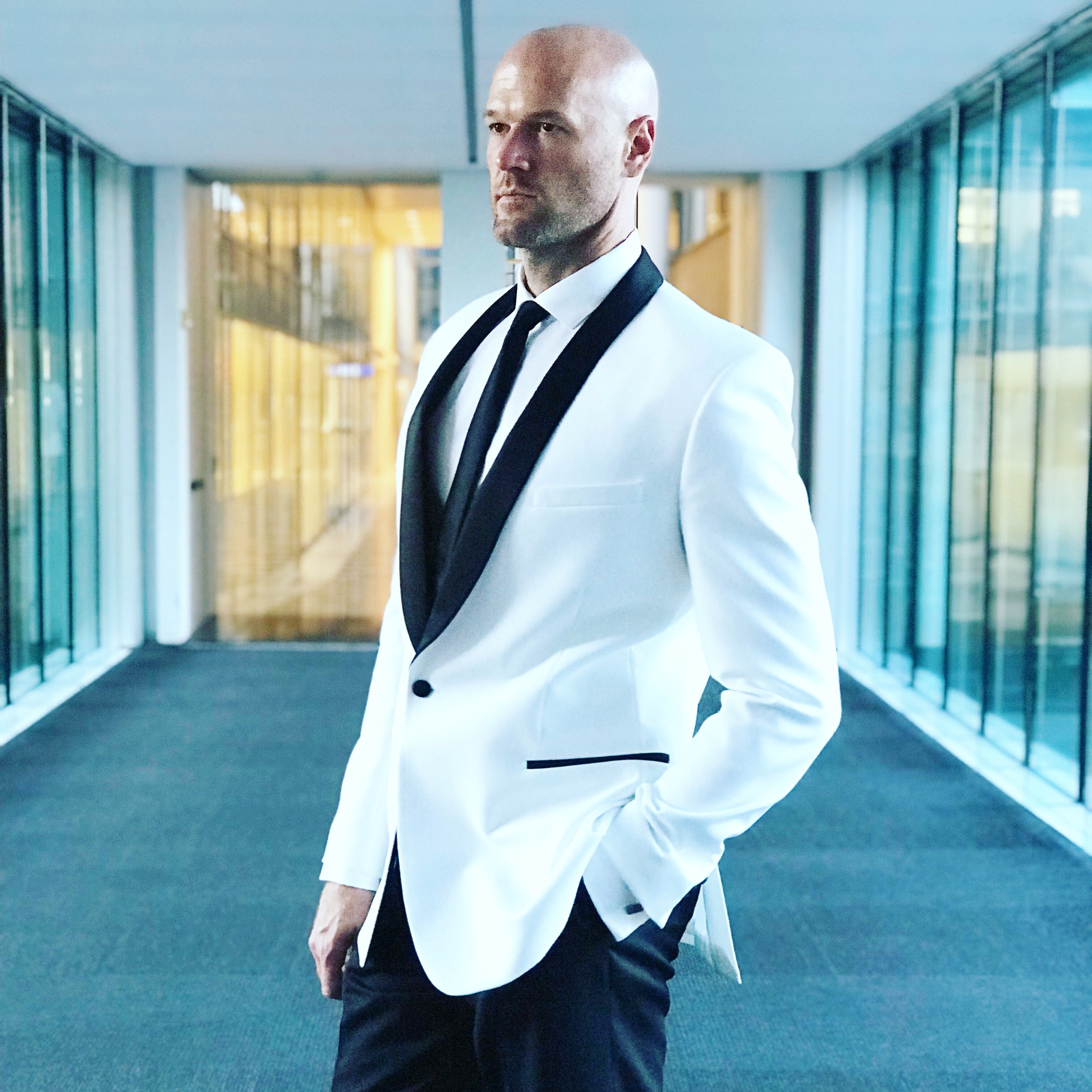
- Born: December 7, 1981 (age 44); Providence, Rhode Island
- Occupations: TV, stage actor, opera singer
- Years active: 2003 - Present
- Known for: The Addams Family; The Perfect American; Akhnaten; Hadestown

Zachary James (born December 7, 1981) is an American actor and singer. He is known for originating the roles of Lurch in The Addams Family on Broadway, the role of Abraham Lincoln in Philip Glass's opera The Perfect American, and Amenhotep III in the Olivier and Grammy Award-winning production of Akhnaten. He is also known for appearances on the television shows, 30 Rock, Murphy Brown, Law & Order: Organized Crime and The Blacklist. Since February 10, 2024, he has starred as Hades in the West End production of Hadestown at the Lyric Theatre in London. James was named the Most Innovative Opera Singer of 2019 by The Classical Post, Breakout Opera Artist of 2019 by Verismo Magazine and was identified as an industry leader and invited to be an official ambassador for Opera America. He has sung with some of the world's top opera companies and orchestras including English National Opera, LA Opera, Teatro Real, The New York Philharmonic, Philadelphia Orchestra, Opera Philadelphia and NHK Symphony Orchestra Tokyo and made his Metropolitan Opera debut in 2019 in Akhnaten. His debut visual album, Call Out, has played 31 film festivals worldwide and received the highly commended designation from London’s Classical Music Digital Awards. His solo show, On Broadway, won him BroadwayWorld’s Vocalist of the Decade and Performer of the Decade awards for the years 2010-2020. The show was filmed live at Chris’s Jazz Cafe in Philadelphia, produced by Des Moines Metro Opera, and released as an album in 2021. James is the host and creator of the comedy talkshow, What Happened Was... which aired every Friday on TDO Network, 2021 thru 2023, produced by Dallas Opera.

== Biography ==
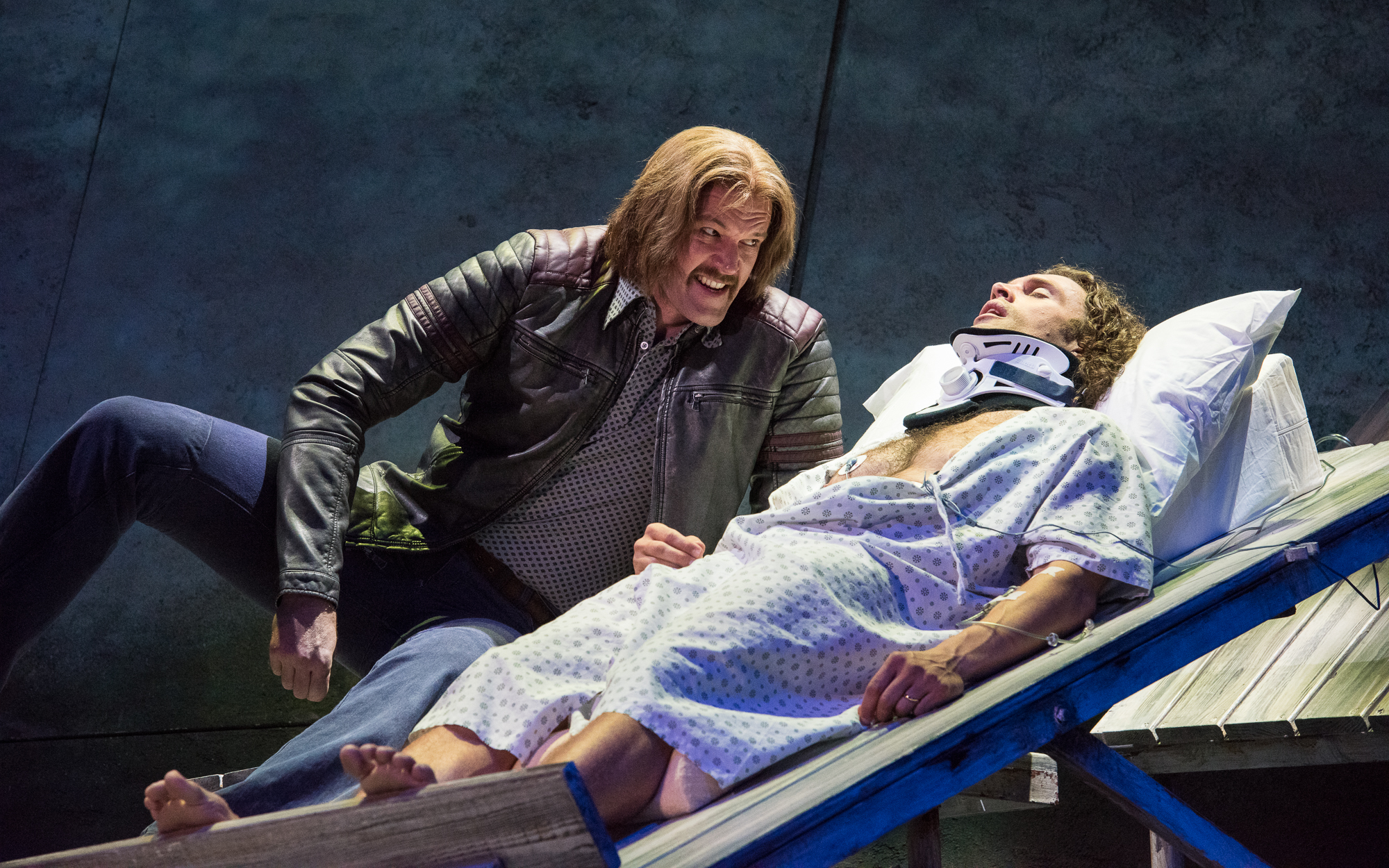
James (left) as Terry in Breaking the Waves at Opera Philadelphia, with John Moore as Jan

=== Early life ===
James was born in Providence, Rhode Island and grew up in Spring Hill, Florida. The son of a professional jazz guitarist, James played percussion and served as drum major in his high school marching band. Although his first goal was to become a band director, he had a longing for musical theater. James, inspired by actor Nathan Lane, majored in musical theatre at Ithaca College and later moved to New York City.

=== Career ===
Zachary James created the role of Lurch in the Broadway musical production of The Addams Family. James appeared in the Original Broadway Cast of Coram Boy and also in the original cast of the Tony Award-winning Broadway revival of South Pacific. His West End credits include Hades in the original cast of Hadestown and Dom Frollo in the concert production of The Hunchback of Notre Dame. New York credits include the role of Oberon in the world premiere of Kristin Hevner's Il Sogno. As an operatic singer, he created the role of Abraham Lincoln in Philip Glass' opera The Perfect American at the Teatro Real in Madrid which was broadcast on Medici TV and created the role of Terry in the world premiere of Breaking the Waves by Missy Mazzoli for Opera Philadelphia. He created the speaking role of The Scribe/Amenhotep III in Phelim McDermott's Laurence Olivier Award winning 2016 production of Philip Glass’s Akhnaten at English National Opera. He reprised the role in the production’s revivals at the Los Angeles Opera, English National Opera in 2019 and the Metropolitan Opera in November and December 2019. James played the role of John Claggart in Billy Budd at Des Moines Metro Opera in 2017. The production was broadcast on Iowa Public Television and won an Emmy Award. He also performed with English National Opera, Los Angeles Opera, The Philadelphia Orchestra, NHK Symphony Orchestra Tokyo, The New York Philharmonic, Des Moines Metro Opera, Cincinnati Opera, Dallas Opera, Opera Omaha, Opera Saratoga, Arizona Opera, Virginia Opera, Nashville Opera, Fort Worth Opera, Ash Lawn Opera, Knoxville Opera, Central City Opera, Anchorage Opera, Opera Roanoke, Union Avenue Opera, Opera Ithaca, Shreveport Opera, American Lyric Theater, New York City Ballet and Australia's Opera Queensland.

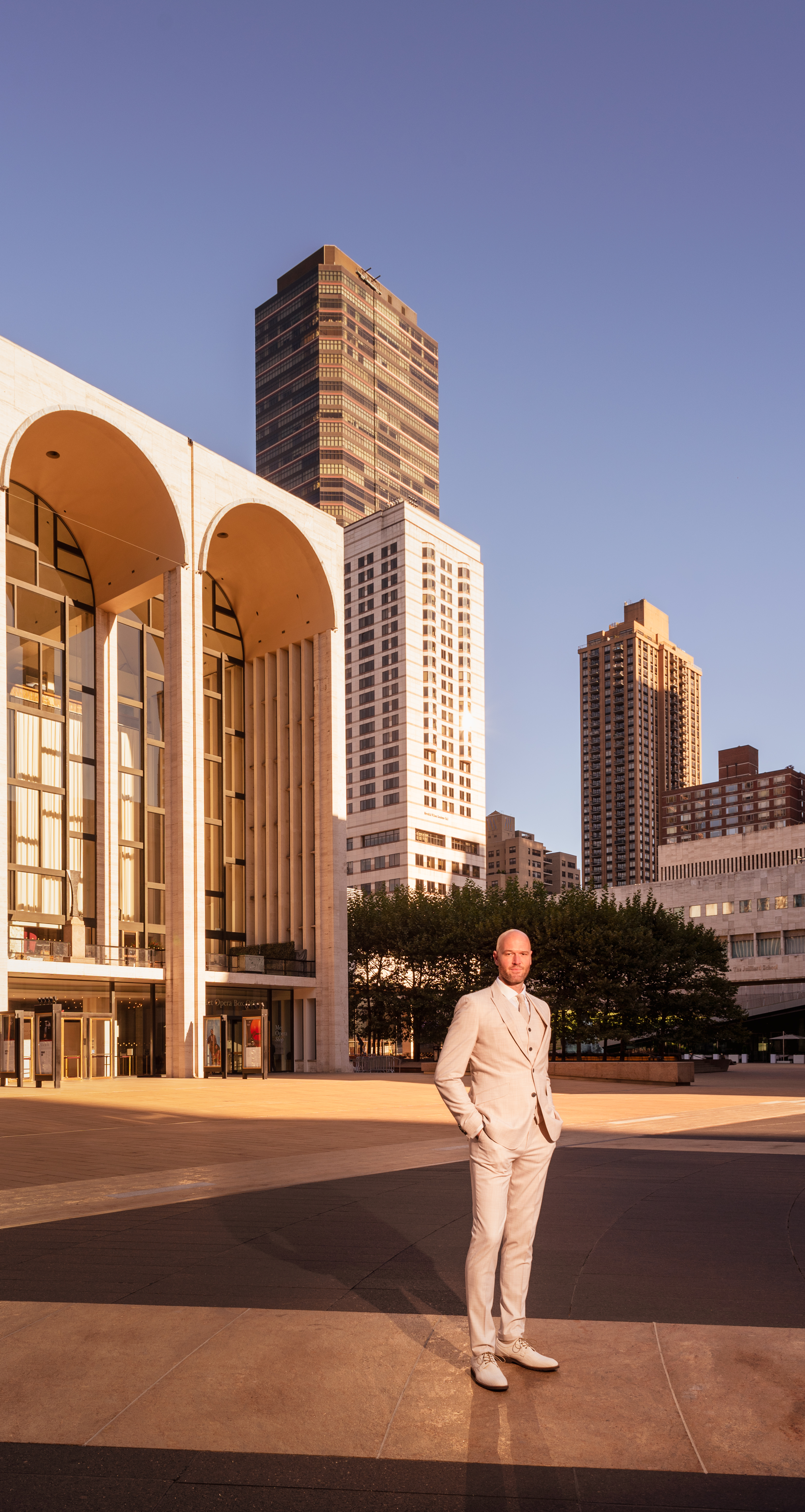
Opera Singer Zachary James at The Metropolitan Opera

In 2015, he appeared as Samuel in New York City Center’s Off-Broadway revival of The Pirates of Penzance. Regional theatre credits include Caiaphas in Jesus Christ Superstar at the Hollywood Bowl, Count Carl-Magnus Malcolm in A Little Night Music, Miles Gloriosus in A Funny Thing Happened on the Way to the Forum, Sweeney Todd in Sweeney Todd: The Demon Barber of Fleet Street, and Don Quixote / Miguel de Cervantes in Man of La Mancha. James also appeared in his own one man opera, Imbecile d' Amour, that played in New York in 2008, in Chicago in late 2009, and again in New York in 2010 and 2011. In 2010 through the end of 2011 he starred as Lurch in the original cast of the Broadway musical The Addams Family. In 2008, James made a cameo appearance as the character "Carl" in the 30 Rock episode "Gavin Volure". In 2018 he appeared on CBS as the Secret Serviceman to Mike Pence on the series finale of Murphy Brown and in 2022 on NBC's Law & Order: Organized Crime as Jacob. His solo show, Zachary James on Broadway, about his time working on Broadway and living in New York has been seen in Alaska, Hawaii, Iowa, Florida, New York and Pennsylvania. James won the 2022 Grammy Award for Best Opera Recording for his work on Philip Glass' Akhnaten.

=== Personal life ===
James is an out gay artist and has been featured in LGBTQ publications and interviews and was named one of the 30 most influential LGBTQIA+ artists in Opera by OperaWire. James is a life-long advocate for animal rights and volunteers with the anti-fur trade fox sanctuary, Pawsitive Beginnings, in Key Largo, Florida, He narrated their mini documentary, Chasing Fur, in 2020. He is a sexual assault survivor and came forward with his story in 2019 as part of the MeToo Movement. He lived and traveled with his rescued miniature pinscher, Sir Arthur "Artie" Seymour Sullivan, named after the British composer of The Pirates of Penzance for eleven years until Artie's death in 2023. James has been sober since November 2011, and credits sobriety as a key factor of his success.

== Theatre credits ==
Year	Production	Role	Theatre
2007	Coram Boy	Choir	Broadway
2007	A Funny Thing Happened on the Way to the Forum	Miles Gloriosus	Theatre-By-the-Sea
2008-2009	South Pacific	Seabee Thomas Hassinger	Broadway
2009-2010	The Addams Family	Lurch	Oriental Theatre
2010-2011	The Addams Family	Lurch	Broadway
2012	The Addams Family	Lurch	US National Tour
2014	Sweeney Todd: The Demon Barber of Fleet Street	Ensemble	Avery Fisher Hall
2014	The Most Happy Fella	Pasquale	Encores!
2014	Irma La Douce	Jojo-les-Yeux-Sales	Encores!
2015	The Pirates of Penzance	Samuel	Encores!
2017	West Side Story	Action	Kimmel Center for the Performing Arts
2021	Man of La Mancha	Don Quixote / Miguel de Cervantes	Saratoga Performing Arts Center
2021	Young Frankenstein	The Monster	Ogunquit Playhouse
2022	Sweeney Todd: The Demon Barber of Fleet Street	Sweeney Todd	Opera Omaha
2023	A Little Night Music	Count Carl-Magnus Malcolm	Denver Center for the Performing Arts
2023	SPAIN	Karl	Off-Broadway
2024	Hadestown	Hades	West End
2025	Jesus Christ Superstar	Caiaphas	Hollywood Bowl
2025	The Hunchback of Notre Dame	Dom Claude Frollo	West End
2026	Carousel	Billy Bigelow	REV Theatre Company

== Awards ==
- 2021 Cult Critic Movie Awards
- 2022 Grammy Award Best Opera Recording
