= Christopher Purves =

English singer (born 1961)

- Born: Cambridge, England
- Genres: Opera, rock
- Occupation: Bass-baritone singer
- Instrument: Vocals

Christopher Watt Purves (born 11 October 1961) is an English bass-baritone.

== Early life ==
Purves was born in Cambridge, the youngest of the four sons of Dr Michael Jarvie Purves and his wife Dr Jean Purves, both physicians. He sang as a boy treble in the choir of King's College, Cambridge, where he was later a choral scholar, studying English literature. By the time he was a student, Purves was singing bass, alongside Gerald Finley, who was in the same year group. The tenor Mark Padmore was another contemporary.

He graduated BA in 1983, promoted to MA in 1987. After leaving Cambridge, Purves joined the close harmony group Harvey and the Wallbangers.

== Career ==
Purves sang with Opera North in several productions in the seasons 1997 to 2004 and later. He performed with The Sixteen and has an extensive discography. Purves featured on the CD cover as Figaro in Opera in English's release of Mozart's The Marriage of Figaro in 2004. He was one of the artists on the Lamenti recital (Virgin Classics) which won Record of the Year in 2009 at France's Victoires de la musique classique. He premiered the role of Protector in George Benjamin's 2012 opera, Written on Skin, and the role of Walt Disney in Philip Glass's 2013 opera The Perfect American.

In 2016, Purves was the bass soloist in Beethoven's Ninth at the Proms and later in the year played the title character in Don Giovanni with ENO.

== Personal life ==
In 1993, Purves married Edwina Vernon, company manager at the English National Opera, and they set up home in a flat in Stoke Newington. They have three children and later moved to Oxford, where Edwina Vernon became a music teacher at St Joseph's Catholic Primary School in Headington. In 2011, readers of Oxford Mail voted her teacher of the year.

== Selected discography ==
- Marc-Antoine Charpentier: Leçons de Ténèbres - Office du Mercredi Saint, H.120, H.138, H.141, H.117, H.131, H.126 and Miserere H.173 - C. Greuillet, C. Pelon, C. Purves, Gérard Lesne, Il Seminario Musicale - Virgin Classics, CD 5451072 (1995).
- George Frideric Handel: Finest Arias for Bass Voice, Arcangelo, Jonathan Cohen, Hyperion Records (2013)
