= The Disney Version =

Book by Richard Schickel

The Disney Version: The Life, Times, Art and Commerce of Walt Disney
- Author: Richard Schickel
- Language: English
- Genre: Biography
- Publisher: Simon & Schuster
- Publication date: 1968
- Publication place: United States
- Media type: Print (hardcover, paperback)

The Disney Version: The Life, Times, Art and Commerce of Walt Disney is a 1968 book by Richard Schickel. It is a biography of Walt Disney. It was one of the first polemical books about Disney that takes a harshly critical view of much of his work.

== Reception ==
Stephen J. Whitfield of Brandeis University wrote that the book was "one of the best studies ever done on American popular culture ... unfailingly, consistently intelligent, and eminently readable" while Pauline Kael described it as "a revealing part of American cultural history".

== Criticism ==
Other critics perceived a hypocrisy and a dubious reliability mainly due to the fact that the book was written and released after Walt Disney's death. In his 1982 book The Hollywood Musical, critic and author Ethan Mordden wrote that the book "is favored by the cognoscenti", but "Schickel's resentment of Disney's wealth and power" stood out "like a soapbox nut's exhortation - horror of horrors, the genius turned out to be a capitalist". Disney historian Didier Ghez called it "a strange psychological analysis of Walt and his works".

== See also ==
- Walt Disney: An American Original
- Walt Disney: Hollywood's Dark Prince
- Walt: The Man Behind the Myth
