= Bob Hope's Confessions of a Hooker =

Book by Bob Hope

- Author: Bob Hope

Bob Hope's Confessions of a Hooker: My Lifelong Love Affair with Golf is a 1985 book written by Bob Hope with the assistance of Dwayne Netland.

According to Hope, the genesis of the book took place in discussions with Bill Davis, founder and editor of Golf Digest and Dick Symon of the advertising firm D'arcy-Masius-MacManus. Doubleday & Company Inc. published the book. It was re-released in 1987 in paperback format, with an additional chapter. The book's foreword was written by former president Gerald Ford.

The book chronicles Hope's passion for the game of golf and recounts his involvement in the sport dating back to the 1920s. It features Hope's personal recollections of all facets of his involvement in the game, as well as the people he played with.

Hope donated his entire fee from the book to the USO.
