= Walt: The Man Behind the Myth =

2001 biographical documentary about Walt Disney

- Cover of initial DVD release, 2001.
- Written by: Katherine Greene; Richard Greene; Jean-Pierre Isbouts
- Directed by: Jean-Pierre Isbouts
- Narrated by: Dick Van Dyke
- Country of origin: United States
- Original language: English

Production
- Producers: Cathie Labrador; Katherine Greene; Richard Greene; Walter Elias Disney Miller
- Running time: 86 minutes (television and VHS); 119 minutes (DVD); 117 minutes (Blu-ray)
- Production companies: Pantheon Productions; The Walt Disney Family Foundation

Original release
- Network: ABC
- Release: September 16, 2001

Walt: The Man Behind the Myth is a 2001 biographical documentary film on the life of Walt Disney. Narrated by Dick Van Dyke, the film was produced by The Walt Disney Family Foundation and directed by Jean-Pierre Isbouts.

== Plot ==
The film is a detailed overview of Walt Disney's life—from his birth in Chicago in 1901 to his death in California in 1966. Topics covered include his difficult childhood, going to France at the end of World War I, his beginnings in animation, success with Mickey Mouse and the Silly Symphonies, his personal life and marriage to Lillian Disney, moving into animated features with Snow White and the Seven Dwarfs, the 1941 strike at his studio, the struggles of the World War II years, the development and opening of Disneyland Park, the making of Mary Poppins, and Disney's initial ideas for "Disney World" and EPCOT before his death.

The documentary also looked at Disney's personal work habits, worldview, and leadership style—putting special attention to debunking negative rumors associated with Disney, such as accusations of racism and antisemitism.

== Production ==
Diane Disney Miller, the eldest daughter of Walt Disney, had considered creating a documentary about her father for many years, as numerous books and other publications depicted her father in a negative light. Miller, and the rest of her family, wanted to create a more balanced look at Disney's life and dispel negative rumors and stories that have surrounded him for decades.

In addition to footage of Disney and from his films and television shows, previously unreleased home video footage from the Disney family was also used in the documentary. In addition, the production crew shot new footage for the film on location in places where Disney lived and worked—including the family's former farm in Marceline, Missouri, Kansas City, Missouri, the Walt Disney Studios in Burbank, California, and Disneyland.

== Release ==
The film was first released on television on September 16, 2001, as an episode of The Wonderful World of Disney on ABC, as a part of the company's promotion of Walt Disney's 100th birthday celebration. Michael Eisner, then CEO of The Walt Disney Company, provided a brief introduction to the film that also touched upon the September 11, 2001 attacks, which had taken place only five days prior.

Clips from the film were used as part of the preshow for The Walt Disney Story Featuring Great Moments with Mr. Lincoln in Disneyland as part of a refurbishment of the attraction in 2001.

Walt: The Man Behind the Myth was originally released on VHS and DVD by Disney in 2001. The DVD was a 119-minute extended version of the original 86-minute documentary released on television and on VHS, and included bonus features, such as additional interview footage. The film was released on Blu-ray by The Walt Disney Family Foundation in 2016 with no bonus features, and was recut to 117 minutes. The documentary has also been streamed on Netflix.

== Notable interviewees ==
Over 50 individuals were interviewed for the documentary, including many who knew Walt Disney personally. Other interviewees include filmmakers, historians, and authors.

- Ken Annakin
- Xavier "X" Atencio
- Sharon Baird
- Norman "Buddy" Baker
- Ray Bradbury
- Michael Broggie
- Bob Broughton
- Bobby Burgess
- Rolly Crump
- Peter Ellenshaw
- Alice Estes Davis
- Marc Davis
- Roy E. Disney
- Karen Dotrice
- Buddy Ebsen
- Richard Fleischer
- Bruce Gordon
- Joe Grant
- Bob Gurr
- Ollie Johnston
- Chuck Jones
- Ward Kimball
- John Lasseter
- Art Linkletter
- Bill Littlejohn
- Bill Melendez
- Christopher Miller
- Diane Disney Miller
- Jennifer Miller-Goff
- Joanna Miller
- Ron Miller
- Tamara Miller
- Floyd Norman
- Fess Parker
- Harrison "Buzz" Price
- Richard M. Sherman
- Robert B. Sherman
- Dave Smith
- Jack Spiers
- Robert Stack
- Bob Thomas
- Frank Thomas
- Dick Van Dyke

== See also ==
- Walt Disney: An American Original—the official written biography of Walt Disney, first released in 1976.
- Saving Mr. Banks—2013 film dramatizing the making of Mary Poppins.
- Walt & El Grupo—another documentary film produced by The Walt Disney Family Foundation, highlighting Disney's trips to Latin America in 1941 and 1942.
