= Diane Disney Miller =

Elder child of Walt Disney and his wife Lillian Bounds Disney (1933–2013)

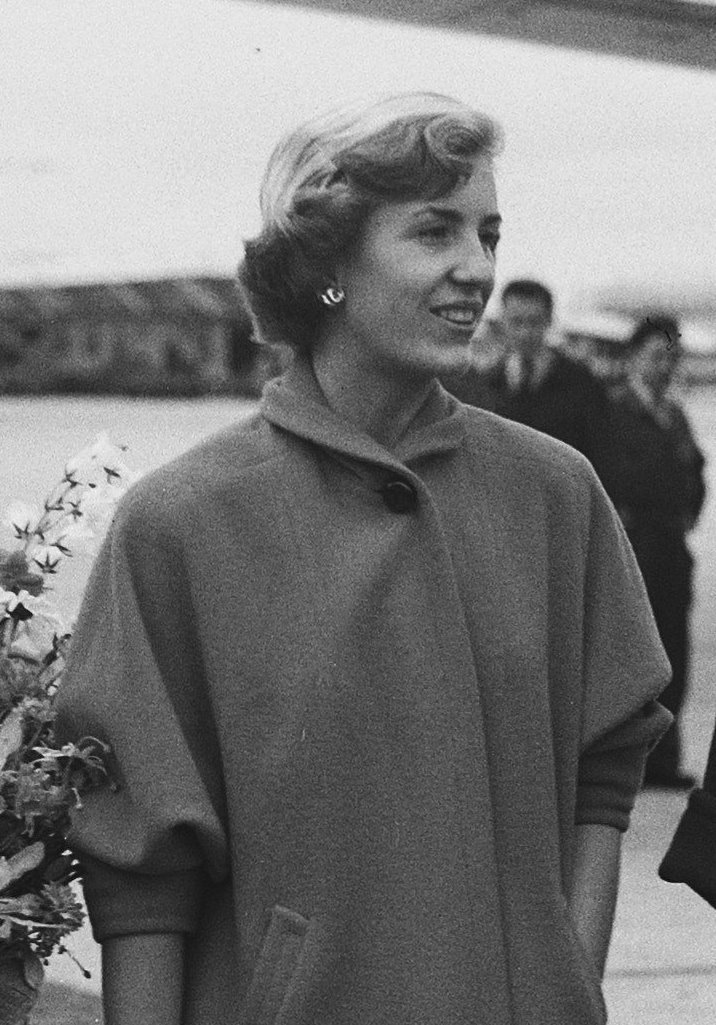
- Disney in 1951
- Born: Diane Marie Disney; December 18, 1933; Los Angeles, California, U.S.
- Died: November 19, 2013 (aged 79); Napa, California, U.S.
- Spouse: Ron W. Miller (m. 1954)
- Children: 7
- Parents: Walt Disney (father); Lillian Bounds (mother)
- Relatives: Disney family

Signature
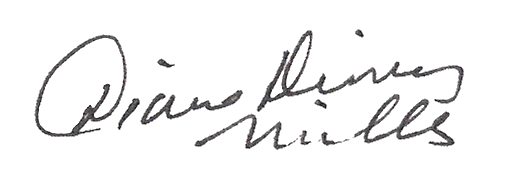

Diane Marie Disney Miller (née Disney; December 18, 1933 – November 19, 2013) was the eldest daughter and only biological child of Walt Disney and his wife Lillian Bounds Disney. Miller co-founded the Walt Disney Family Museum alongside her family. She was president of the Board of Directors of the Walt Disney Family Foundation.

== Early and personal life ==
Diane Marie Disney was born in Los Angeles on December 18, 1933. She attended Los Feliz Grammar School before moving to Immaculate Heart High School (Los Angeles) for junior high school and high school. Disney went on to study English at the University of Southern California.

When she was 20 years old, Disney was introduced to 21-year-old University of Southern California student Ron Miller, a member of the USC Trojans football team, on a blind date after a University of California–USC game. They married in a small Episcopal church ceremony in Santa Barbara on May 9, 1954. Together, the couple had had seven children: Christopher (b. 1954), Joanna (b. 1956), Tamara (b. 1958), Jennifer (later Miller-Goff; b. 1960), Walter (b. 1962), Ronald (b. 1964), and Patrick (b. 1966). Her husband then served in the Army and played professional football before Walt Disney convinced him to work for the Walt Disney Studios, and ascended from film directing and production to president and CEO of what is now The Walt Disney Company.

== Philanthropy ==
Miller was a patron of the arts, as well as a lifelong classical music enthusiast and a philanthropist.

Miller published a series of eight pieces for the Saturday Evening Post in 1956 titled "My Dad, Walt Disney", co-written with Pete Martin. In 1957 she published the book The Story of Walt Disney. After her husband was removed from his executive position at Walt Disney Productions in 1984, Miller began to limit her involvement with the company.

After her husband joined the Disney company, Miller traveled to Napa Valley with her mother, Lillian, to visit several wineries. The trip inspired Miller to start a vineyard, with the possibility of a winery. With the children grown, Ron left the company and the entertainment industry in 1984. Both he and Diane went on to develop the renowned Silverado Vineyards Winery in Napa, which became their home. In 1976, the family purchased a large property along the Silverado Trail in the Stags Leap District. They planted Cabernet Sauvignon and Chardonnay and started making wine in 1981. They expanded the winery to only process estate-grown grapes and Diane helped create the family home atmosphere rather than just a business.

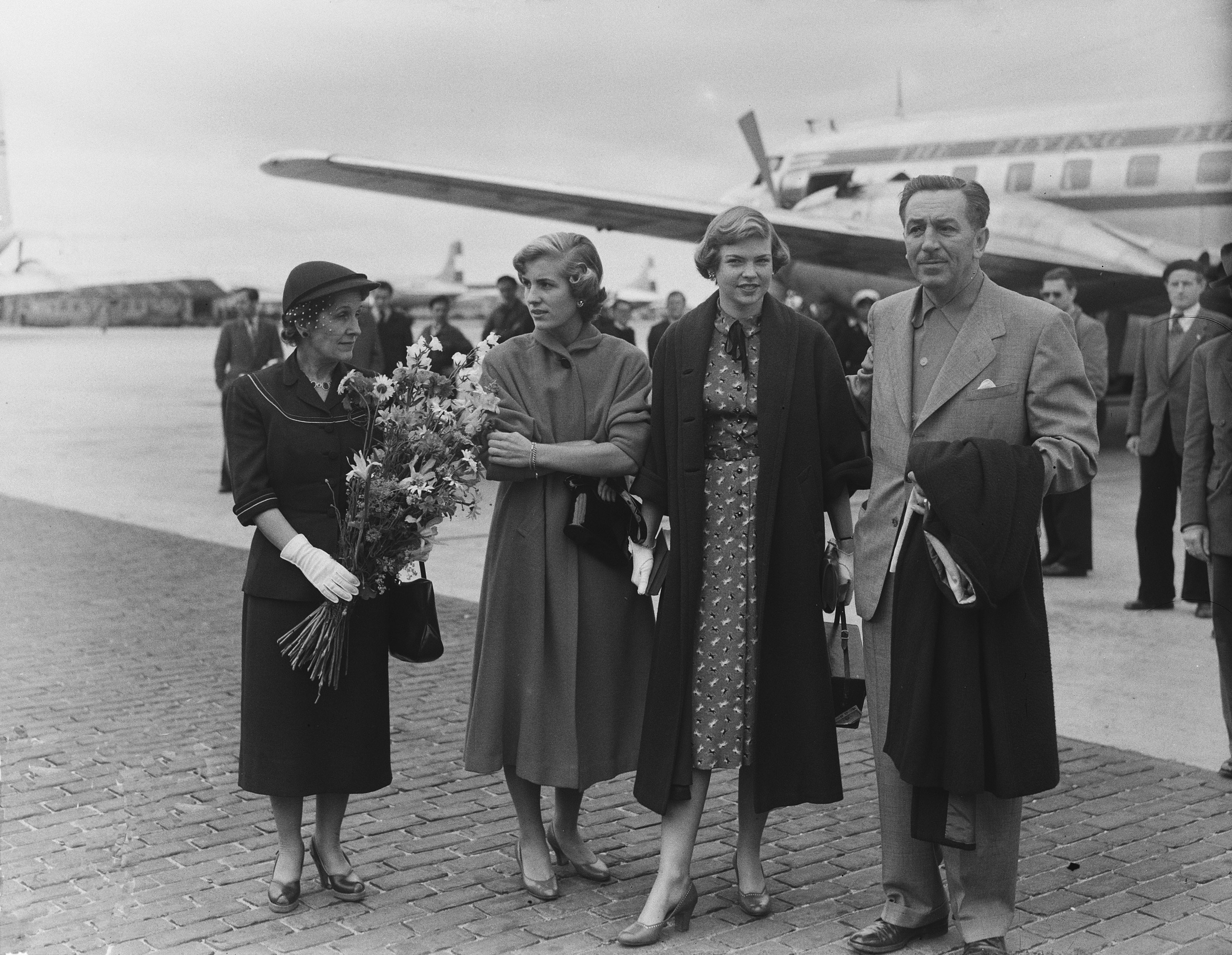
Disney family (1951)

Miller was instrumental in pushing ahead with the Walt Disney Concert Hall in downtown Los Angeles. In 1988, Lillian Disney, her mother, announced plans to contribute $50 million to the Los Angeles Concert Hall in Downtown Los Angeles, which Miller would later come to support throughout her life. More than 70 architectural firms submitted proposals to the head director, Frank Gehry. By 1996, the project was almost dead, but Miller persuaded Gehry to move forward with it, despite problems with poor management and disagreements over the design, and Los Angeles County officials' attempts to cancel it. It was supposed to be worth $10 million by 1997. Diane arranged for the Walt Disney Family Foundation to contribute about $25 million to keep Gehry in control, and the hall finally opened in 2003, at the cost of $247 million. Although Lillian Disney died in 1997 and never saw a concert there, Miller continued to support the concert hall.

After devoting her earlier life to raising her seven children, Miller undertook an active advocacy to document the life and accomplishments of her father, who she perceived to have been the subject of poorly researched biographies and inaccurate rumors. She was also concerned that his name had become more of a corporate identity than a reference to the man himself. In 2001, the Walt Disney Family Foundation released The Man Behind the Myth, a documentary film about Walt Disney's life featuring interviews with his colleagues, peers, and family. In 2009, Miller co-founded the Walt Disney Family Museum with her son Walter Elias Disney Miller, who is a movie producer, and Miller was also the president of the Board of Directors of the Walt Disney Family Foundation at the time of her death, which is a nonprofit organization that owns and operates the Walt Disney Family Museum, located in The Presidio of San Francisco.

In 2015, the inaugural Diane Disney Miller Lifetime Achievement Award was created to honor the museum's founder, to recognize those who have made an outstanding impact in the field of arts, education, community involvement, or technological advancements.

=== Honorees ===
- 2015 – Richard Sherman
- 2016 – Marty Sklar
- 2017 – John Lasseter

== Death and dedication ==
Miller died on November 19, 2013, at age 79, from medical complications that developed after a fall in September the same year.

The film Saving Mr. Banks is dedicated to her memory; Miller died shortly before it opened theatrically.

Ron and Diane Disney Miller received a special thank you in Inside Out (2015).
