= Lillian Disney =

Wife of Walt Disney (1899–1997)

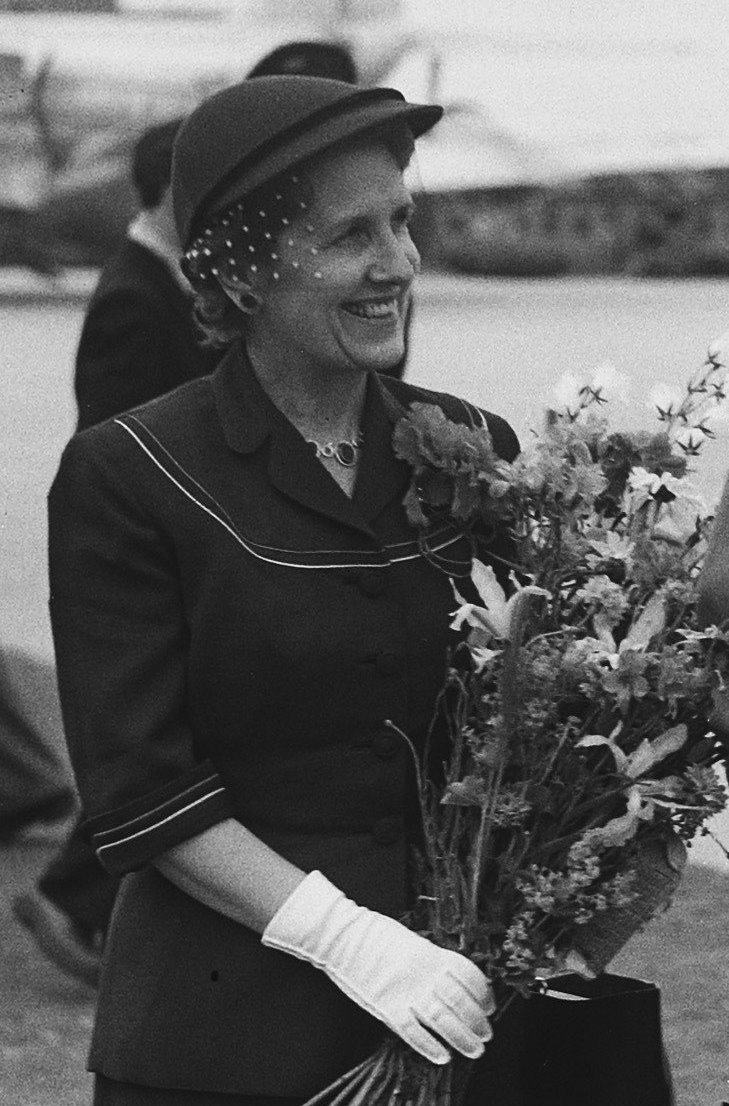
- Disney in 1951
- Born: Lillian Marie Bounds; February 15, 1899; Spalding, Idaho, U.S.
- Died: December 15, 1997 (aged 98); West Los Angeles, California, U.S.
- Burial place: Forest Lawn Memorial Park, Glendale, California, U.S.
- Occupations: Ink and paint artist
- Years active: 1924–1997
- Spouses: Walt Disney (m. 1925; died 1966) John L. Truyens (m. 1969; died 1981)
- Children: 2, including Diane

Lillian Marie Disney (née Bounds; February 15, 1899 – December 15, 1997) was an American ink artist and the wife of Walt Disney from 1925 until his death in 1966. Born in Spalding, Idaho, Disney graduated from high school in Lapwai before moving to Lewiston to attend college. She left Idaho in 1923 to move to Southern California, where she met future husband Walt while working as a secretary for his company.

During a train ride in 1928, Walt revealed to his wife a new animated character, whom he called "Mortimer Mouse". Lillian suggested that he rename his character "Mickey Mouse", a name which has since become synonymous with the Disney brand.

Walt Disney died from lung cancer on December 15, 1966, after which Lillian remarried, to John L. Truyens (a Southern California real estate developer) from 1969 until his death in 1981. On December 15, 1997, Disney suffered a stroke and died the following morning in Los Angeles at age 98.

== Early years ==
Born Lillian Marie Bounds in Spalding, Idaho, she grew up in nearby Lapwai on the Nez Perce Indian Reservation, where her father Willard worked as a blacksmith and federal marshal. She was the youngest of ten children, and the family struggled financially; her father died when she was seventeen. After graduation from Lapwai High School, Bounds and her mother moved down to Lewiston; she attended a year of business college then moved to southern California in 1923 to live with her sister Hazel's family. She met Walt Disney while working for his unit at Alice Comedies producer Winkler Pictures as an ink and paint artist.

== Marriage to Walt Disney ==
Lillian Bounds and Walt Disney married on July 13, 1925, in Idaho at her brother's home. The wedding was officiated by the rector of Lewiston's Episcopal Church of the Nativity. Walt Disney's parents did not attend. As Bounds's father was deceased, her uncle, who was chief of the Lewiston Fire Department, gave the bride away. She wore a dress that she had made herself. The couple had two daughters, Diane Marie Disney (1933–2013) and Sharon Mae Disney (1936–1993), the latter of whom was adopted. Disney had ten grandchildren: seven by Diane and her husband (Ron W. Miller), and three by Sharon and her two husbands, Robert Brown and William Lund.

== Recognition ==
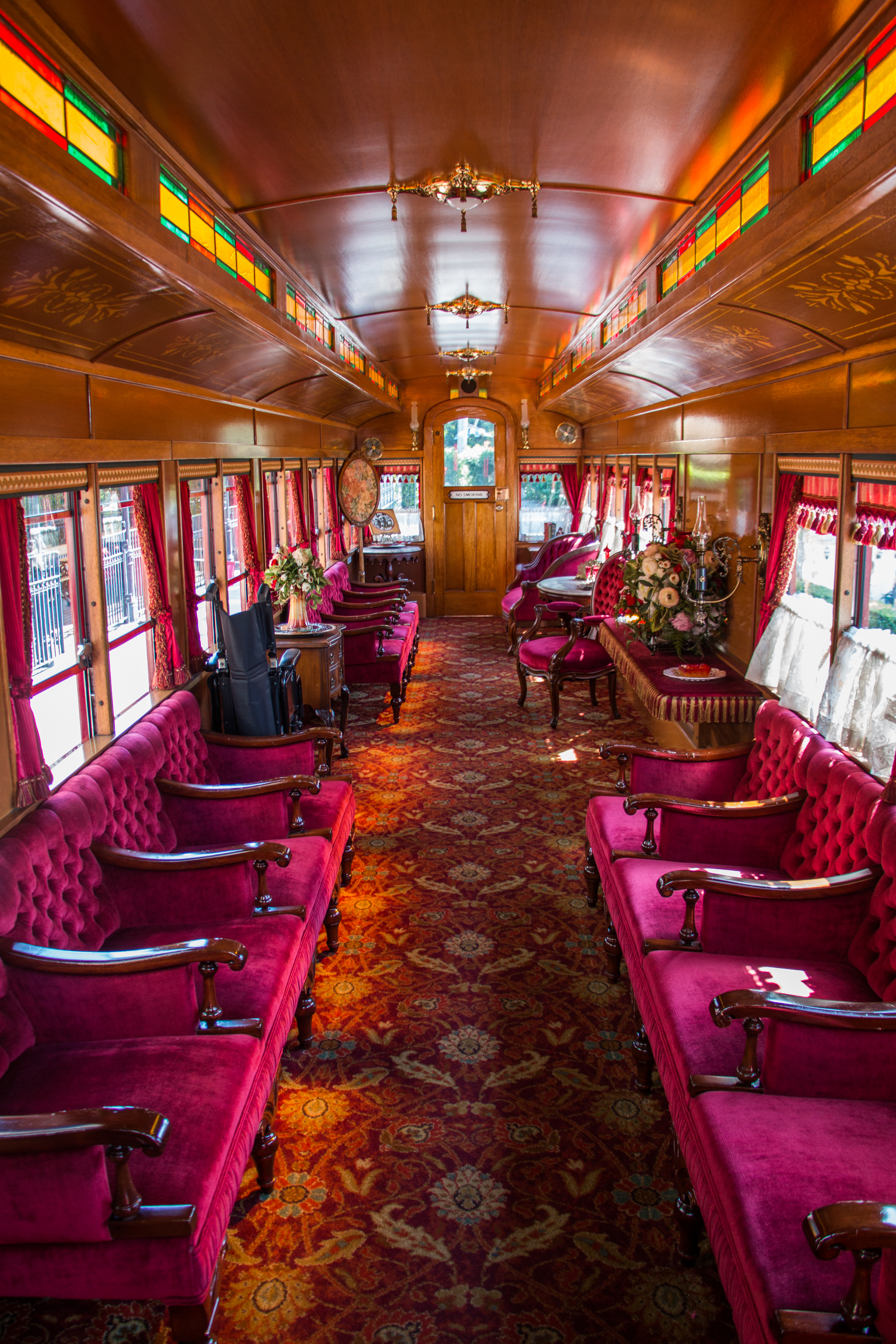
Interior of the Lilly Belle train car at Disneyland

Her film career includes work as an ink artist on the film Plane Crazy. Disney is credited with having named her husband's most famous character, Mickey Mouse, during a train trip from New York to California in 1928. Walt showed a drawing of the cartoon mouse to his wife and told her that he was going to name it "Mortimer Mouse". Lillian replied that the name sounded "too depressing" and she was very proud to have suggested the name "Mickey Mouse" instead of Mortimer.

At the Carolwood Pacific Railroad, Walt Disney named his 1:8-scale live steam locomotive the "Lilly Belle" in his wife's honor. Additionally, the parlor car of the Disneyland Railroad was named the "Lilly Belle" in her honor, and the Walt Disney World Railroad has a locomotive named "Lilly Belle", where each locomotive is named for someone who greatly contributed to the Walt Disney Company. Walt Disney Imagineering created "The Empress Lilly", a paddle steamer replica, at Walt Disney World in Disney Springs and Disney christened it on May 1, 1977. Disney was posthumously inducted into the Disney Legends in 2003.

== Later years and death ==
Walt Disney died of lung cancer on December 15, 1966, at the age of 65. Lillian married John L. Truyens in May 1969 until his death on February 24, 1981, at the age of 73.

In 1987, she pledged a $50 million gift towards the construction of a new concert hall in Los Angeles. After several delays, the Walt Disney Concert Hall opened in 2003, six years after her death. She also helped fund the founding of The California Institute of the Arts. In 1996, she donated $100,000 to the Nez Perce indigenous people in support of buying back tribal artifacts.

In response to a controversial biography, Lillian made a rare public statement about her marriage with Walt, "We shared a wonderful, exciting life, and we loved every minute of it. He was a wonderful husband to me, and wonderful and joyful father and grandfather."

Lillian Disney suffered a stroke on December 15, 1997, exactly 31 years after Walt's death. She died the following morning at her home in West Los Angeles at the age of 98. She was interred at Forest Lawn Memorial Park in Glendale, California alongside her first husband, Walt Disney.
