= Walt Disney: An American Original =

- Author: Bob Thomas
- Language: English
- Genre: Non-fiction
- Publisher: Touchstone/Simon & Schuster
- Publication date: November 1976
- Publication place: United States

Walt Disney: An American Original is a 1976 non-fictional book by Bob Thomas.

== Reception ==
Animation historian Didier Ghez considered the book to be the definitive biography of Walt Disney.

== Publication history ==
The book was later republished by Disney Editions in 1994 and in 2023.

== See also ==
- Walt: The Man Behind the Myth - 2001 documentary about Walt
- Golden Age of American animation
- The Disney Version - the 1968 book by film critic Richard Schickel
