= Bob Thomas (reporter) =

American journalist

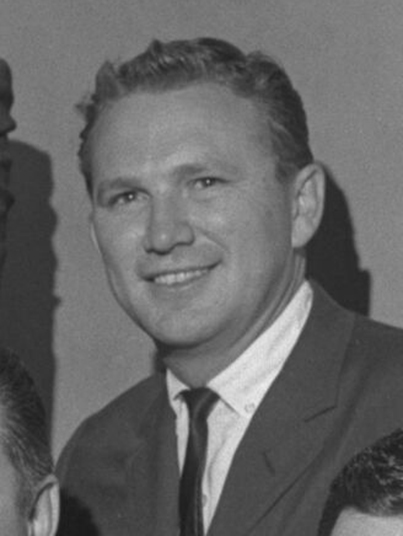
- Thomas in 1963
- Born: Robert Joseph Thomas; January 26, 1922; San Diego, California, U.S.
- Died: March 14, 2014 (aged 92); Encino, California, U.S.
- Occupations: Biographer, reporter
- Spouse: Patricia (m. 1947)
- Children: 3

Robert Joseph Thomas (January 26, 1922 – March 14, 2014) was an American film industry biographer and reporter who worked for the Associated Press from 1944 to 2010.

As of 2014, he was twice listed in the Guinness World Records, for the longest career as a reporter, and for the most consecutive Academy Awards shows covered by an entertainment reporter.

== Biography ==
Thomas was born in San Diego, California in 1922. He grew up in Los Angeles, where his father worked as a publicist for Warner Bros., Metro-Goldwyn-Mayer, Paramount Pictures, and Columbia Pictures.

Thomas first joined the Associated Press in Los Angeles in 1943, where he aspired to be a war correspondent. However, he was assigned as a correspondent in Fresno, California, where he stayed for more than a year before quitting. He returned to the Los Angeles bureau in 1944 and was appointed as their entertainment reporter. He was also told to use the name "Bob Thomas" as his birth name was thought to be too formal. During his career at the AP, Thomas authored at least 30 books, most of them biographies of prominent film industry personalities, including Irving G. Thalberg, Joan Crawford, Marlon Brando, and Walt Disney.

=== Personal life ===
He lived in Encino with his wife, Patricia. They had three daughters. Thomas, aged 92, died on March 14, 2014, at his home.

== Awards and honors ==
For contributions to the motion picture industry, Thomas received a star on the Hollywood Walk of Fame, becoming the first author-reporter to be given this honor, which was paid for by his friends in advance and placed at 6879 Hollywood Boulevard. In 2009, in recognition of over 60 years of covering the entertainment business for the Associated Press, the Publicists Guild awarded him a Lifetime Achievement Award.

== Bibliography ==
=== Nonfiction ===
- If I Knew Then (with Debbie Reynolds)
- The Art of Animation
- The Massie Case (with Peter Packer)
- King Cohn
- Liberace: The True Story
- Thalberg
- Selznick
- The Secret Boss of California: The Life and High Times of Art Samish (with Arthur Samish)
- The Heart of Hollywood
- Winchell
- Howard, the Amazing Mr. Hughes (with Noah Dietrich)
- Marlon: Portrait of the Rebel as an Artist
- Joan Crawford
- The Road to Hollywood (with Bob Hope)
- Bud & Lou: The Abbott and Costello Story
- The One and Only Bing
- Walt Disney: An American Original
- Golden Boy: The Untold Story of William Holden
- I Got Rhythm: The Ethel Merman Story
- “Building a Company: Roy O Disney and The Creation of An Entertainment Empire”

=== Fiction ===
- The Flesh Merchants
- Weekend 33

=== For children ===
- Walt Disney: Magician of the Movies
- Donna DeVarona, Gold Medal Winner

=== Anthology ===
- Directors in Action
