= Veronica (name) =

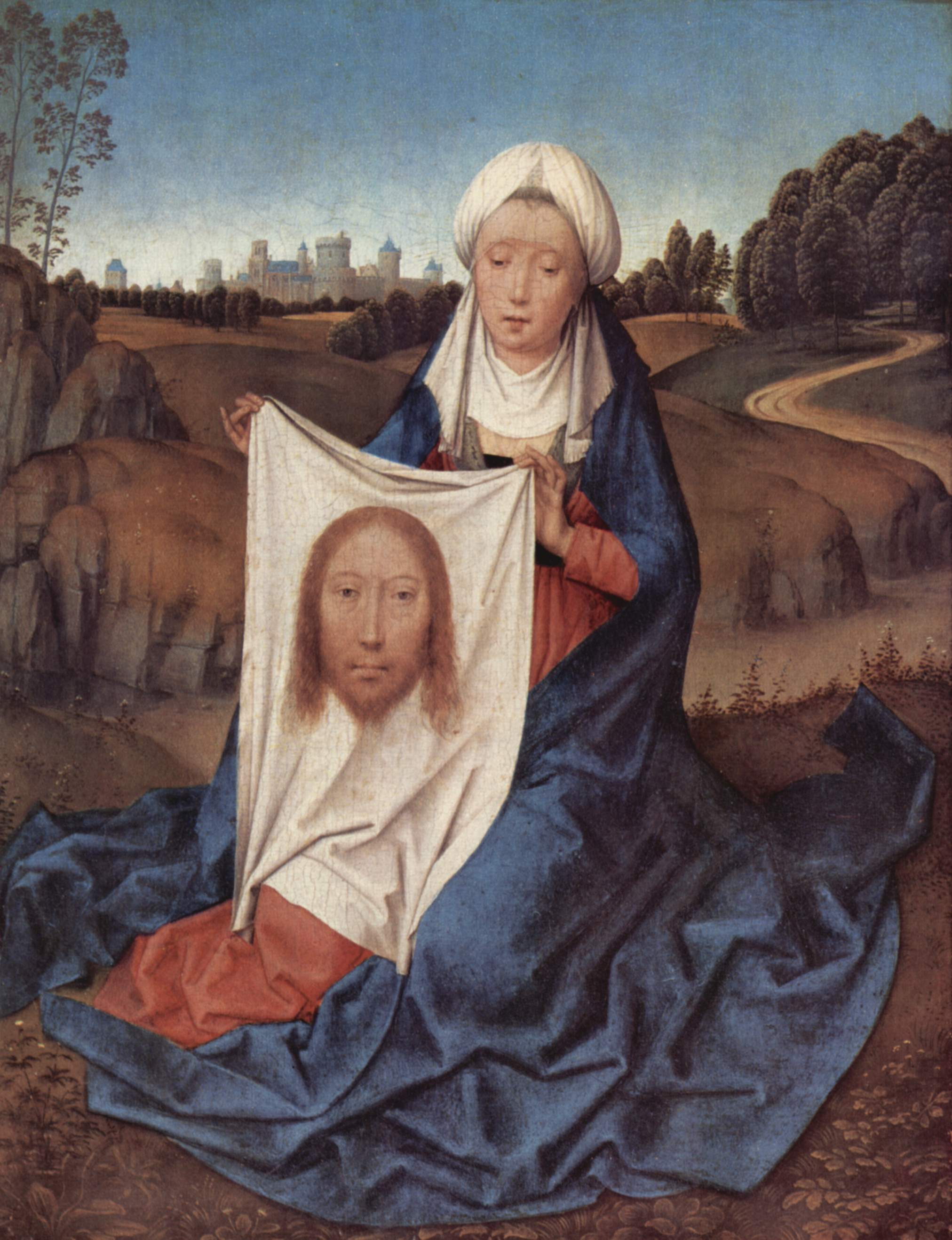
- Saint Veronica
- Pronunciation: /vəˈrɒnɪkə/
- Gender: Female

Origin
- Origin: Greek, Latin
- Meaning: bringing glory

Other names
- Related names: Bernice, Berenice

Veronica (variants in other languages: Veronika, Verónica, Verônica, Véronique, Weronika, Вероника, Вероніка) is a female given name, a Latin alteration of the ancient Macedonian name Berenice (Βερενίκη), which in turn is derived from the Macedonian form of the Attic Greek Φερενίκη, Phereníkē, or Φερονίκη, Pheroníkē, from φέρειν, phérein, to bring, and νίκη, níkê, "victory", i.e. "she who brings victory".

The Ancient Macedonian form of the name was extensively used as a royal feminine name by the reigning dynasties of the states of the Diadochi of Alexander the Great throughout the Eastern Mediterranean during the Hellenistic age, most notably by the Ptolemaic dynasty of Egypt and by the Seleucids of the Levant.

In medieval etymology, Veronica was sometimes supposed to derive from Latin vera (true) and Greek eikon (image).

Its popularity in medieval and modern times is derived from the prominence in Christianity of Saint Veronica and her Veil of Veronica. Pet forms of Veronica include Ronnie and Roni and the German Vroni. Vero in Spain. In Russian, the pet forms are Nika (Ника), Vera (Вера) -faith, and Verunia (Веруня), and in Poland Wera. Veronica is a popular name in many countries in the Mediterranean, Eastern Europe, and Latin America, and also Ireland, France, and French-speaking Canada.

== Given name ==
- Veronica (singer) (born 1974), American dance music singer
- Verónica I of Matamba, Matamba queen regnant
- Verónica II of Matamba, queen of Ndongo and Matamba
- Veronika (cow), Austrian cow
- Verónica Abad Rojas (born 1976), Ecuadorian politician
- Veronica Abrahamse (born 1980), South African shot putter
- Veronica Abramciuc (born 1958), Moldovan politician
- Veronika Aigner (born 2003), Austrian para alpine skier
- Verónica Alcocer (born 1976), First Lady of Colombia since 2022
- Verónica Alonso (born 1973), Uruguayan politician
- Veronica Alvarez (born 1983), American baseball catcher
- Verónica Ampudia (born 1973), Mexican alpine skier
- Veronica Anstey (1935–2014), English amateur golfer
- Veronica Antal (1935–1958), Romanian Catholic martyr, beatified in 2018
- Verónica Arbo (born 1968), Argentine canoeist
- Verónica Arias (born 1983), Ecuadorian politician
- Verónica Artica (born 1970), Argentine field hockey player
- Veronica Augustyn, American materials scientist and academic
- Veronica Ballestrini (born 1991), American singer
- Veronica Bawuah (born 1967), Ghanaian sprinter
- Verónica Becher, Argentine computer scientist
- Veronica Beechey (1946–2021), British writer, psychotherapist, researcher and activist
- Veronica Bekoe, Ghanaian biologist
- Veronica Belmont (born 1982), American Internet TV and webcasting host
- Veronica Bennett (1943–2022), American singer better known as Ronnie Spector
- Veronika Bernatskaia, Kyrgyz football referee and former football player
- Veronica Bertolini (born 1995), Italian rhythmic gymnast
- Veronica Isala Eragu Bichetero (born 1953), Ugandan politician
- Veronica Grace Boland (1899–1982), American politician
- Veronica Bolay (1941–2020), German-Irish painter
- Verónica Bolón-Canedo, Spanish computer scientist
- Verónica Boquete (born 1987), Spanish footballer
- Veronica Borsi (born 1987), Italian hurdler
- Veronica Bowman, British statistician
- Veronica Brady (1929–2015), Australian religious sister and writer
- Veronica Brebner, American make-up artist
- Veronica Brenner (born 1974), Canadian freestyle skier
- Veronica Brill, poker player and journalist
- Veronika Bromová (born 1966), Czech painter
- Veronica Brunori (born 2000), Italian karateka
- Veronica Buckley, British biographer
- Veronica Burns (1914–1998), Irish curator
- Veronika Buroňová, Czech weightlifter in 2001 World Weightlifting Championships – Women's 63 kg and 2003 World Weightlifting Championships – Women's 63 kg
- Veronica Burton, multiple people
- Veronica Calabrese (born 1987), Italian taekwondo practitioner
- Verónica Caliva (born 1977), Argentine politician
- Veronica Campbell Brown (born 1982), Jamaican track and field sprint athlete
- Veronica Carlson (1944–2022), English model and actress
- Verónica Carreón Cervantes (born 1970), Mexican politician
- Veronica Carstens (1923–2012), German First Lady
- Veronica Cartwright (born 1949), American actress
- Veronica Zepeda Cashman (born 1982), Mexican footballer and futsal player
- Veronica Castang (1938–1988), British actress
- Verónica Castro (born 1952), Mexican actress
- Verónica Castro (gymnast) (born 1979), Spanish gymnast
- Verónica Cepede Royg (born 1992), Paraguayan tennis player
- Veronica Chambers, Afro-Latina writer and teacher
- Veronica Chater, American writer
- Veronica Chou (born 1984/1985), Hong Kong businesswoman
- Veronika Chvojková (born 1987), Czech tennis player
- Veronica Clarke (1912–1999), Canadian figure skater
- Verónica Colindres (born 1986), Salvadoran race walker
- Veronica Cochela (born 1965), Romanian rower
- Veronica Cojuhari (born 1998), Moldovan footballer
- Veronica Cooper (1913–2000), American actress
- Veronica Cornolti (born 1994), Italian cyclist
- Verónica Cruz Sánchez (born 1971), Mexican activist
- Veronica de la Cruz (born 1980), American television news anchor
- Verónica Cuadrado (born 1979), Spanish handball player
- Veronica Cummings (born 1973), Guamanian swimmer
- Veronica Czitrom, Mexican-American statistician
- Veronica Dahl, Canadian computer scientist
- Veronica De Laurentiis (born 1950), Italian author and actress
- Veronica Degraffenreid, American election official
- Veronica DiCarlo Wicker (1930–1994), American judge
- Veronica Perrule Dobson (born 1944), Australian linguist and ecologist
- Veronica della Dora, Italian cultural geographer and professor
- Veronica Doran (born 1948), British character actress
- Veronica Dorsette, Montserratian politician
- Veronica Dragalin (born 1985), Moldovan lawyer
- Veronica Drăgan (born 1973), Romanian entrepreneur
- Veronica Dunne, multiple people
- Veronica Duterte, the daughter of Philippine president Rodrigo Duterte with Honeylet Avanceña
- Veronica van Dyk (born 1968), South African politician
- Veronika Dytrtová (born 1980), Czech figure skater
- Verónica Echegui (1983–2025), Spanish film and TV actress
- Veronica Eriksson (born 1971), Swedish pole vaulter
- Veronika Erjavec (born 1999), Slovenian tennis player
- Veronica Escobar (born 1969), American politician
- Verónica Escobar Romo (born 1955), Mexican lawyer and politician
- Verónica Espinosa, Ecuadorian medic and politician
- Veronica Ewers (born 1994), American cyclist
- Veronika Exler (born 1990), Austrian chess player
- Verónica Falcón (born 1966), Mexican actress and choreographer
- Veronika Fenclová (born 1981), Czech sailor
- Verónica Ferraiuoli (born 1971), Puerto Rican politician and lawyer
- Veronica Ferres (born 1965), German actress
- Veronica Findlay (born 1964), Jamaican sprinter
- Veronica Finn, member of American pop group Innosense 1997–2003
- Veronica Fish (born 1985), American comic book artist and painter
- Veronika Foltová (born 1980), Czech Paralympic athlete
- Veronica Fontana (1651–1690), Italian artist
- Verónica Forqué (1955–2021), Spanish actress
- Veronica Forrest-Thomson (1947–1975), poet and critic in Scotland and England
- Veronica Foster (1922–2000), Canadian cultural icon during the Second World War
- Veronica Fraley (born 2000), American athlete
- Veronica Franco (1546–1591), poet and courtesan in 16th century Venice
- Veronica Freeman (born 1977), American singer
- Veronika Freimanová (born 1955), Czech actress
- Veronica Fusaro (born 1997), Swiss singer and songwriter
- Veronika Gajerová (active 1980–2008), Czech actress in Housata, Who's That Soldier? and Dobrá čtvrť
- Veronica Gajownik (born 1993), American softball and baseball player
- Veronica Gambara (1485–1550), Italian poet and politician
- Verónica García Reyes (born 1977), Mexican politician
- Veronica Gentili (born 1982), Italian journalist, TV presenter and actress
- Veronica Gerbi, Italian curler
- Veronica Marcela Gerez, Argentine cyclist
- Veronica Gibson (1937–2022), Scottish arts patron
- Veronica Giuliani (1660–1727), Italian mystic
- Verónica Gómez (1985–2012), Venezuelan volleyball player
- Veronica Gonzalez Peña, American writer and filmmaker
- Veronica Lucy Gordon, journalist, radio broadcaster and human rights activist
- Veronica Gorrie (born 1971/1972), Aboriginal Australian writer
- Veronica Green (born 1985), British drag performer
- Veronica Grymonprez (born 1944), Belgian gymnast
- Veronica Guerrieri, Italian and American economist
- Veronica Guerin (1958–1996), murdered Irish journalist
- Veronika Gut (1757–1829), Swiss rebel heroine
- Veronica Hamel (born 1943), American actress
- Veronika Harcsa (born 1982), Hungarian singer and songwriter
- Veronica Hardstaff (born 1941), British politician
- Veronica Hardy (born 1995), Venezuelan mixed martial arts fighter
- Veronica Harrigan, rugby player
- Veronica Hart (born 1956), American pornographic actress
- Veronica Hazelhoff (1947–2009), Dutch writer
- Veronica Helfensteller (1910–1964), American painter and printmaker
- Veronica Henry, British writer
- Veronica Herber, New Zealand artist
- Verónica Herrera (born 2000), Venezuelan footballer
- Veronica van Heyningen (born 1946), English geneticist
- Verônica Hipólito (born 1996), Brazilian Paralympic athlete
- Veronika Hoferková (born 1982), Czech footballer
- Verónica Homs, Spanish model and presenter
- Veronica Hughart (1907–1977), American artist, architectural designer and journalist
- Veronica Hults (born 1998), American artistic gymnast
- Veronica Hurst (1931–2022), English actress
- Veronica Inglese (born 1990), Italian long-distance runner
- Verónica Isbej (born 1976), Chilean biathlete
- Veronika Ivasiuk (born 1995), Ukrainian weightlifter
- Veronica Ivy, philosophy professor, competitive cyclist and transgender rights activist
- Verónica Jaspeado (born 1976), Mexican actress and voice actress
- Veronika Jeníková, Czech actress in Vražda v salonním coupé, Housata, Bony a klid and Victims and Murderers
- Veronica Johnson, American meteorologist
- Veronica V. Jones, American artist
- Verónica Juárez Piña (born 1971), Mexican politician
- Veronica Kadogo (born 1977), Ugandan politician
- Veronica Kay (born 1980), American surfer
- Veronica Kelly, Australian handball player
- Veronica Kerr (born 1970), Swedish politician
- Veronica de Klerk (born 1947), Namibian activist
- Veronica Klinefelt (born 1964), American politician
- Veronica Koman (born 1988), Indonesian lawyer and human rights activist
- Veronika Kormos (born 1992), Hungarian cyclist
- Veronika Korzhova (born 2007), Ukrainian Paralympic swimmer
- Veronica Kristiansen (born 1990), Norwegian handball player
- Veronika Kropotina (born 1991), Russian figure skater
- Weronika Książkiewicz (born 1981), Russian-born Polish actress
- Veronika Kubařová, Czech actress in Lidice
- Veronika Kudermetova (born 1997), Russian tennis player
- Veronica Kvassetskaia-Tsyglan (born 1966), Canadian artist
- Veronica Lake (1922–1973), American film actress
- Veronica Lang, Australian actress
- Verónica Langer (born 1953), Mexican actress
- Veronica Lario (born 1956), Italian actress
- Veronica Latsko (born 1995), American soccer player
- Veronica Lauren (born 1980), American actress
- Veronica Lazăr (1938–2014), Italian actress
- Verónica Leal (born 1993), Colombian adult model
- Verónica Linares (born 1976), Peruvian journalist, TV and radio presenter
- Veronica Lindholm (born 1984), Swedish politician
- Veronica Linklater, Baroness of Linklater Butterstone (1943–2022), British life peer
- Veronica Lisi (born 1987), Italian rower
- Verónica Llinas (born 1960), Argentine actress
- Veronica Logan (born 1969), Italian film and TV actress
- Verónica Lope Fontagne (born 1952), Spanish politician
- Verónica Loyo, Mexican singer and actress
- Verónica Lozano (born 1970), Argentine actress and TV host
- Verónica Lynn (born 1931), Cuban actress and theatre director
- Verónica Macamo (born 1957), Mozambican politician
- Veronika Machyniaková (born 1997), Slovak biathlete
- Veronika Machová (born 1990), Czech beauty pageant contestant
- Veronica Maclean (1920–2005), British food writer and hotelier
- Veronica MacIsaac, Canadian fashion designer who specialises in tartan
- Veronica Mafolo, South African former politician and convicted criminal
- Verónica Magario (born 1969), Argentine politician
- Veronica Maggio (born 1981), Swedish pop singer
- Veronica Maglia (born 1989), Swiss footballer
- Veronica Mallett, urogynecologist and medical academic
- Verônica Marques (born 1996), Brazilian professional footballer
- Veronika Martinek (born 1972), German tennis player
- Verónica Martínez de la Vega, Mexican mathematician
- Veronica Mehta (active since 1996), British Asian singer
- Veronica Mente, South African politician
- Verónica Merchant (born 1967), Mexican actress
- Veronica Merrell (born 1996), American actress and YouTuber
- Veronica Micle (1850–1889), Imperial Austrian-born Romanian poet
- Veronica Miele Beard, American entrepreneur and fashion designer
- Veronica Mihailov-Moraru (born 1982), Moldovan lawyer
- Veronica Milsom (born 1984), Australian radio presenter
- Veronica Monet (born 1960), American activist for sex worker rights
- Verónica Montes (born 1990), Peruvian actress and model
- Veronika Moos-Brochhagen (born 1961), German textile artist
- Veronika Morávková (born 1983), Czech ice dancer
- Veronica Murdock (c. 1944–2024), American civil servant
- Verónica Murguía (born 1960), Mexican fantasy writer
- Veronica Kamumbe Mutua (born 1992), Kenyan track and field athlete
- Veronica Namaganda Nanyondo (born 1986), Ugandan politician
- Veronica Navarro (born 1990), Mexican rhythmic gymnast
- Veronica Necula (born 1967), Romanian rower
- Veronica Nnaji (born 1940), Nigerian nurse and politician
- Veronica Nunn (born 1957), American jazz singer
- Veronica Nyaruai (born 1989), Kenyan runner
- Veronica Olivier (born 1990), Italian actress
- Veronica Openibo (born 1951), Nigerian religious sister
- Verónica Orozco (born 1979), Colombian actress and singer
- Veronica Paeper (born 1944), South African choreographer and dancer
- Verónica Páez (born 1974), Argentine marathon runner
- Veronica Paiz, American politician
- Verónica Palenque (born 1967), Bolivian psychologist, journalist, academic and politician
- Veronica Palm (born 1973), Swedish politician
- Verónica Pamiés (born 1976), Spanish boccia player
- Verónica de Paoli (born 1973), Argentine hurdler
- Veronica Papworth (1913–1992), British journalist and illustrator
- Veronika Part (born 1978), Russian ballet dancer
- Veronica Penny, Canadian spelling bee regional champion
- Verónica Pérez (born 1988), Mexican footballer
- Verónica Pérez Fernández (born 1978), Spanish politician
- Veronica Perrule Dobson, Eastern Arrente linguist, educator, elder, traditional owner, author and ecologist
- Veronika Pincová (born 1989), Czech footballer
- Veronica Pivetti (born 1965), Italian actress and voice actress
- Veronica Planella (born 1963), Canadian field hockey player
- Veronika Podrez (born 2007), Ukrainian tennis player
- Veronika Poláčková (born 1982), Czech actress
- Veronica Portillo (born 1977), American reality television personality
- Veronika Portsmuth (born 1980), Estonian conductor
- Veronica Porumbacu (1921–1977), Romanian poet, prose writer and translator
- Verónica Prono (born 1978), Paraguayan swimmer
- Veronica Pyke (born 1981), Australian cricketer
- Veronica Quarshie, Ghanaian director and producer
- Veronika Rabada (born 1984), Slovak singer
- Veronika Rajek (born 1996); Slovak internet personality
- Veronica Raimo (born 1978), Italian screenwriter
- Verónica Ramos, Bolivian economist and politician
- Verónica María Ravenna (born 1998), Argentine luger
- Veronica Redd (born 1948), American actress
- Veronika Redder (born 2004), German freestyle skier
- Veronica Rehn-Kivi (born 1956), Finnish politician
- Veronika Remenárová (born 1997), Slovak basketball player
- Verónica Reyes, American poet
- Verónica Ribot (born 1962), Argentine diver
- Verónica Riveros (born 1987), Paraguayan footballer
- Veronica Roberts, British actress
- Verónica Romero (born 1978), Spanish singer
- Veronica Roșca (born 1982), Moldovan jurist and politician
- Veronica Rose (1911–1968), British actress
- Veronica Rossi (born 1973), Brazilian-American novelist
- Veronica S. Rossman (born 1972), Russian-American judge
- Veronica Roth (born 1988), American dystopian author
- Veronica Rotin (born 2004), Maltese singer
- Veronica Rudian, Italian pianist, producer and poet
- Veronica Rueckert, American author
- Verónica Ruíz (born 1989), Spanish rhythmic gymnast
- Verónica Ruiz de Velasco (born 1968), Mexican artist
- Veronica Ryan (born 1956), Montserrat-born British artist
- Veronica Ryan (teacher) (1921–1966), Irish teacher
- Veronika Sabolová (born 1980), Slovak luger
- Verónica Sada Pérez (born 1963), Mexican politician
- Verónica Saladín (born 1992), Dominican Republic weightlifter
- Verónica Sánchez (born 1977), Spanish actress
- Veronika Šarec (born 1969), Slovenian skier
- Veronica Schanoes, American writer and academic
- Veronica Schildt Bendjelloul (born 1944), Swedish translator
- Veronica Schneider (born 1978), Venezuelan model and actress
- Veronika Schmidt (born 1952), German skier
- Veronica Scopelliti (born 1982), Italian singer Noemi
- Veronica Scott (born 1986), American fashion designer, Fuchsia CEO, television personality
- Veronica Sentongo, Ugandan electric engineer and corporate executive
- Veronica Serrato, American immigration lawyer
- Veronica Servente (born 1977), Italian gymnast
- Veronica Seton-Williams (1910–1992), Australian anthropologist and archaeologist
- Veronica Signorini (born 1989), Italian triathlete
- Veronica Sims, American politician
- Veronica Sirețeanu (born 1985), Moldovan economist poet politician
- Veronica Small-Eastman, American politician
- Veronica Smedh (born 1988), Swedish alpine skier
- Veronica Smirnoff (born 1979), British artist of Russian origin
- Veronica Smith (born 1942), American fencer
- Veronica Sobukwe (1927–2018), South African anti-apartheid activist
- Veronika Sprügl (born 1987), Austrian cyclist
- Veronika Sramaty (born 1977), Slovak painter
- Veronika Stallmaier (born 1964), Austrian skier
- Veronica St. Clair (born 1994), American actress
- Veronica Steele (1947–2017), Irish artisan cheesemaker
- Veronica Stele (born 1977), Argentine tennis player
- Veronica Strong (born 1938), British actress
- Veronica Strong-Boag, Canadian historian
- Veronica Sutherland (born 1939), British career diplomat
- Veronica Swanson Beard, American entrepreneur and fashion designer
- Veronica Swift (born 1994), American jazz and bebop singer
- Veronica Sywak (born 1978), Australian actress
- Veronica Tan (born 1977), Indonesian politician
- Verónica Tapia (born 1961), Mexican composer
- Veronica Taylor (active since 1997), American voice actress
- Veronica Tennant (born 1946), Canadian producer, director and filmmaker
- Veronica Thörnroos (born 1962), Finnish politician
- Veronica Turleigh (1903–1971), Irish actress
- Veronica L. Turner (born 1950), American politician
- Veronica Vaida (born 1950), Romanian-American chemist
- Verónica Valerio, Mexican harpist, singer and composer
- Veronika Valk (born 1976), Estonian architect
- Veronica Vallejos, Chilean marine biologist and Antarctic scientist
- Veronika Vařeková (born 1977), Czech model
- Verónica Vargas (born 1989), Ecuadorian beauty pageant titleholder
- Veronica Varlow (born 1979), American dancer and actress
- Veronica Vasicka, American radio personality
- Veronica Vasquez (born 1974), Argentine cricketer
- Verónica Velasco (born 1972), Mexican politician
- Veronika Velez-Zuzulová (born 1984), Slovak skier
- Veronica Vera (active since 1977), American sexuality writer and actress
- Veronica Vernocchi (born 1978), Italian Muay Thai fighter
- Verónica Vilches (born 1970), Chilean environmentalist
- Verónica Villarroel (active since 1989), Chilean opera singer
- Veronika Vítková (born 1988), Czech biathlete
- Veronica Volkersz (1917–2000), British World War II aviator
- Veronica Waceke, Kenyan actress
- Veronica Wagner (born 1987), Swedish gymnast
- Veronica Wall (born 2000), New Zealand rower
- Veronica Webb (born 1965), American model and actress
- Veronica West, American TV producer and TV writer
- Veronica Widyadharma (born 1977), Indonesian tennis player
- Veronica Willaway (born c. 1944), aboriginal Australian religious sister
- Veronica Yearwood, Antiguan choreographer and dance company founder
- Veronica Yip (born 1967), Hong Kong-American actress
- Veronica Yoko Plebani (born 1996), Italian Paralympic athlete
- Veronica Zappone (born 1993), Italian curler
- Veronika Zhilina (born 2008), Russian figure skater
- Veronika Žilková (born 1961), Czech actress
- Verónica Zondek (born 1953), Chilean poet and translator
- Veronica Zorzi (born 1980), Italian professional golfer
- Verónica Zurita (born 1974), Ecuadorian politician

== In fiction ==
- Veronica Ashford, 1st Countess Ashford, a 19th-century British noblewoman and the founder of aristocratic Ashford family in Resident Evil – Code: Veronica
- Veronica "Vera" Duckworth, a character from British soap opera Coronation Street
- Veronica Duncan, a recurrent character from the TV show Young Sheldon
- Verónica Gómez, title character in Verónica
- Veronica Grogan, a character in Stephen King's It
- Veronica Hopkins, a character in TV series Brooklyn Nine-Nine
- Veronica Kelly, Velma Kelly’s sister in Chicago
- Veronica King, a SHIELD agent in Marvel Comics
- Veronica Lodge, a rich teenage girl in the Archie Comics universe
- Veronica Mars, a television series starring Kristen Bell as the title character
- Veronica "Ronnie" Mitchell, a character from the television soap opera EastEnders
- Veronica Sawyer, the protagonist of the 1988 cult teen film Heathers and its adaptations, including a musical and television adaptation
- Veronica is one of the "Macaw Sisters" in the musical Love Birds
- Veronica, the protagonist of the Romanian children movies Veronica and Veronica Returns
- Veronica Madaraki, the surgically manufactured "sister" of the title character in the Franken Fran manga
- Veronica, the protagonist of a 1989 Elvis Costello song of the same name, his highest-charting in the United States
- Veronica Santangelo, a character in the video game Fallout New Vegas
- Veronica Liones, a character in the manga series Nanatsu no Taizai
- Veronica Sharpe, a character in Enid Blyton's Malory Towers
- Veronica Tribbiani, Joey Tribbiani's sister in the TV show Friends
- Veronica, the sister of Lance from the DreamWorks animated web show Voltron: Legendary Defender
- Aunt Veronica, one of Greg Heffley's aunts in Diary of a Wimpy Kid
- Veronika, protagonist in popular novel Veronika Decides to Die by Paulo Coelho
- Veronica, a character in Black Swan
- Veronica, the protagonist of the first episode of Just Beyond
- Veronica, one of the main characters from the video game Dragon Quest XI
- Veronica, a character from the Nickelodeon animated series The Fairly OddParents
- Veronica, a character from the television movie Sierra Burgess Is a Loser
