= LTH =

LTH may refer to:

- Faculty of Engineering (LTH), Lund University (Swedish: Lunds Tekniska Högskola)
- Licentiate of Theology (LTh), a theological degree
- Link Theory Holdings, a Japanese fashion company
- Long Thanh International Airport (IATA: LTH, ICAO: VVLT), an airport in Vietnam
- Prolactin, or luteotropic hormone, a human protein
- BD-R LTH is a write-once Blu-ray disc format
