= Veronica Beard =

American fashion company

- Type: Private
- Industry: Fashion
- Founded: 2009; 17 years ago
- Founders: Veronica Swanson Beard; Veronica Miele Beard
- Headquarters: New York City, U.S.
- Products: Clothing, accessories
- Website: veronicabeard.com

Veronica Beard is an American contemporary fashion company co-founded by sisters-in-law Veronica Swanson Beard and Veronica Miele Beard. The brand launched in 2009, backed by retail executive Andrew Rosen among a private group of investors. The company has 52 directly-operated stores across North America and Western Europe.

== History ==
The label made its New York Fashion Week debut in September 2012 with its Spring/Summer 2013 collection. In 2012, the label was available in 62 stores, including Saks Fifth Avenue, and 82 stores by the end of 2013. Between 2016 and 2019, the brand's sales increased at an average annual rate of 90% and its headcount tripled. By 2018, the brand's sales exceeded $100 million. By 2020 the brand was carried by over 500 stores worldwide, including Nordstrom, Shopbop and Bergdorf Goodman. In 2023, Veronica Beard opened 10 stores in the US.

== Philanthropy ==
Just Keep Livin' Foundation, founded by Camila Alves and husband Matthew McConaughey, partnered with Veronica Beard in 2019.
