= Veronica Miele Beard =

American entrepreneur and fashion designer

- Born: Veronica Evelyn Miele; North Caldwell, New Jersey, United States
- Education: Franklin & Marshall College
- Occupations: Entrepreneur; Fashion Designer
- Known for: Veronica Beard (clothing brand)
- Spouse: Anson H. Beard
- Children: Five

Veronica Miele Beard is an American entrepreneur and fashion designer who co-founded Veronica Beard, a New York-based fashion company, with her sister-in law Veronica Swanson Beard.

She was born and grew up in North Caldwell, New Jersey.

After college, Miele Beard worked on Wall Street, where she met her husband Anson H. Beard. Prior to starting the fashion line, she worked with Philippe Laffont to launch Coatue Management, a technology hedge fund, where she was partner and COO.

Miele Beard and her sister-in-law founded their eponymous company in 2009, and made their New York Fashion Week debut in September 2012 with its Spring/Summer 2013 collection. In 2012, the label was available in 62 stores, including Saks Fifth Avenue. Between 2016 and 2019, the brand's sales increased at an average annual rate of 90 percent while its headcount tripled. By 2018, the brand's sales exceeded $100 million.

The brand Veronica Beard is backed by retail executive Andrew Rosen among a group of investors, and the brand may be raising more investor funding in 2020. The brand is carried by over 500 stores across the world, including Nordstrom, Shopbop and Bergdorf Goodman. In 2023, the Veronica Beard brand is opening 10 stores across America.

== Personal life ==
Miele Beard is married to Wall Street executive Anson H. Beard, with whom she has five children.
