= Veronica Swanson Beard =

American entrepreneur and fashion designer

- Born: Veronica Swanson; June 23 1979; Naples, Florida, U.S.
- Education: Tulane University Parsons School of Design
- Occupations: Entrepreneur; Fashion Designer
- Known for: Veronica Beard (clothing brand); Swanson inheritance
- Spouse: Jamie Beard
- Children: 3 sons
- Family: Carl A. Swanson (great-grandfather)

Veronica Swanson Beard (born June 23 1979) is an American entrepreneur and fashion designer who co-founded Veronica Beard, a contemporary fashion company, with her sister-in law Veronica Miele Beard. Swanson Beard launched the brand in 2009 and has continued to run it with Miele Beard as the company scaled.

Swanson Beard's fashion label made its New York Fashion Week debut in September 2012 with its Spring/Summer 2013 collection. In 2012, the label was available in 62 stores, including Saks Fifth Avenue. By the end of 2013, that number increased to 82, with a year-over-year sales jump of 30 percent. Between 2016 and 2019, the brand's sales increased at an average annual rate of 90 percent while its headcount tripled. By 2018, the brand's sales exceeded $100 million.

The brand Veronica Beard is backed by retail executive Andrew Rosen among a private group of investors, and the brand may be raising more investor funding in 2020.

== Personal life ==
Swanson Beard's father is W. Clarke Swanson Jr., who owns the Napa Valley winery Swanson Vineyards. She is an heir to the Swanson's frozen foods empire, and her parents were introduced to each other by fashion designer Lilly Pulitzer.

Swanson Beard holds a Bachelor of Arts in Art History from Tulane University and studied at Parsons School of Design before dropping out to work in the fashion industry full time.

Swanson Beard lives on Long Island in the State of New York with her husband, Jamie, and their three sons.
