= Betty Cronin =

American bacteriologist, author, and inventor

Betty Cronin (July 12, 1928–December 11, 2016) was an American bacteriologist and co-author of Campbell’s Great American Cookbook. Some call her "the mother of TV dinners", though the development of the idea has several claimants. She started her career in 1950 working for the Swanson brothers. Later, she moved on to work for Campbell’s Soups which bought out the Swanson brothers’ company, C. A. Swanson and Sons, in 1955. She was director at Campbell’s microwave institute in Camden, New Jersey.

== Career ==
After graduating from Duchesne College, Cronin began working as a bacteriologist for C. A. Swanson and Sons in 1949 or 1950. The Swanson brothers tasked her with developing the world’s first TV dinner. Her job was to figure out how to make them not only work, scientifically, but also to taste good. The challenge of this task was figuring out how to heat several different frozen foods simultaneously in a single package while maintaining optimal taste and texture and eliminating food-borne bacterial growth. In the early stages of development, Cronin would use her friends as test subjects for her dinners.

According to History.com, she is the developer of the concept, and the first completed product was a dinner consisting of cornbread dressing, sweet potatoes, peas, and turkey.

She also developed Swanson’s first fried chicken TV dinner, which she said in a 1989 interview was the biggest challenge of her time with C. A. Swanson and sons.

By 1955, Cronin had moved to Campbell’s, which acquired Swanson soon after. During her time as director at Campbells Microwave Institute, she helped the company perfect the development of a microwaveable tray.

Cronin co-authored Campbell’s Great American Cookbook, published in 1984. The book included over 500 recipes focused on American cuisine from traditional foods dating back to the Colonial period to ethnic recipes that had become part of American culture. Each recipe also contained a short history and variations. Lorrie Gutman of the Tallahassee-Democrat stated it was "one of the most interesting recipe books I've ever read".

Cronin retired from Campbell's Soup Company in 1993 but worked as a consultant to Campbell's into her 60s.

== Personal life ==
Cronin said she "never had a TV dinner in my home".

According to Cronin's obituary, she was raised by Janet and Raymond Cronin and Cecil and Hannah Kelso, and had a friend of 50 years, Irene Milewski. She died on December 11, 2016, while living in Pennsauken Township, New Jersey.
