= Theory (clothing retailer) =

New York-based contemporary fashion label

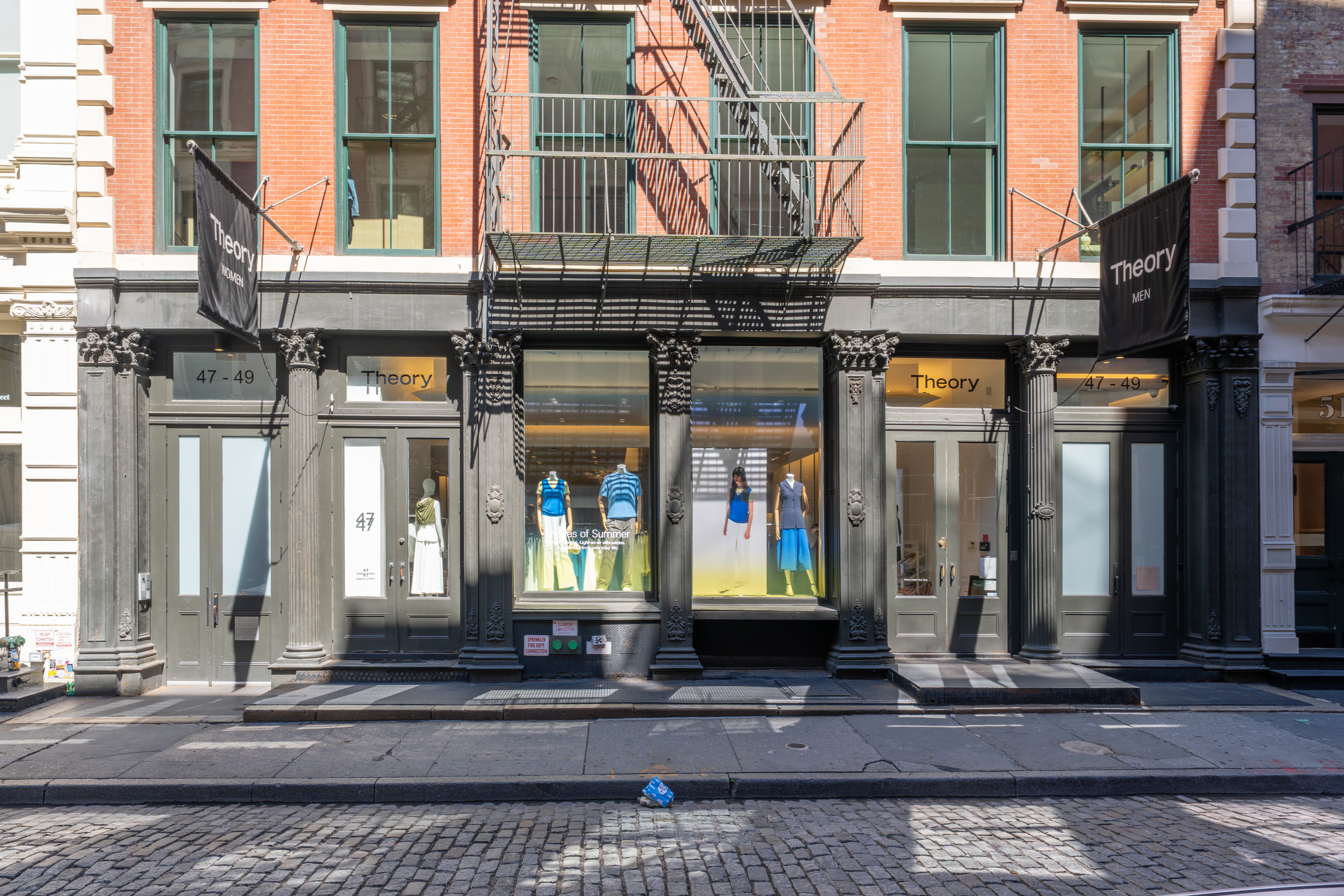
- Storefront in SoHo, Manhattan
- Type: Private
- Industry: Retail
- Founded: December 1997; 28 years ago
- Founder: Andrew Rosen; Elie Tahari
- Headquarters: New York City, U.S.
- Number of locations: 434 (2021)
- Area served: Worldwide
- Key people: John Alvarez; (CEO); Brent Landquist; (CFO)
- Products: Clothing; accessories
- Revenue: ▲US$1 billion
- Owner: Fast Retailing
- Number of employees: 2,100 (2021)
- Website: www.theory.com

Theory is a New York City–based upscale men's and women's contemporary fashion label which sells premium clothes and accessories. The brand has 434 retail locations, and global sales approaching $1 billion as of 2021. The company's headquarters and flagship boutique are located in Manhattan's Meatpacking District.

== Origins and development ==
In 1997, Andrew Rosen, former CEO of Anne Klein and a Calvin Klein executive, launched Theory with co-founder Elie Tahari in New York City as a women's collection, with a focus on comfortable stretch pants. The collection performed well and a men's line was added in 1999.

In 2000, a license agreement was formed with Link International of Japan, established in 1998, to manufacture, and distribute the brand as well as operate stores under the Theory name in Asia, predominantly Japan. Women's handbags and shoes were introduced in 2003, and launched nationally in the U.S. for Spring 2006.

In 2012, the Council of Fashion Designers of America (CFDA) announced Andrew Rosen as the recipient of the Founders Award given in honor of Eleanor Lambert. Theory made its first move into France with two store openings in Paris.

In 2013, Andrew Rosen and the CFDA spearheaded the Fashion Manufacturing Initiative, a project whose ambition is to invest in and guarantee the future of garment factories in Manhattan.

In 2014, Lisa Kulson, former vice president and head designer at Theory, returned as creative director of women's design.

In 2015, Theory unveiled a new logo, its first redesign in 18 years. The branding initiative debuted with the Spring Summer 2015 advertising campaign, featuring Natalia Vodianova with photography by David Sims.

== Acquisition by Link International and Fast Retailing ==
In September 2003, Link International bought an 89% stake in the Theory company for $100 million, after Japanese giant textile firm Fast Retailing Co. of Tokyo – established in 1963 and owner of the popular Uniqlo brand – had acquired a 47.1% stake in Link. Rosen received $49 million, retained the remaining 11% in the new company, and was replaced as CEO by Chikara Sasaki of Link but remained president and COO. Tahari was allocated $53 million of the sale and had no shares in the new company which was renamed Theory Holdings. The deal was explained by the fact that the label was to become a truly "global brand". The Japanese parent company has since then traded under the name of Link Theory Holdings and went public in 2005. Fast Retailing had held a 32.32% stake in LTH since 2004. In spring 2009, Fast Retailing acquired the remaining stock and LTH became a fully owned subsidiary of Fast Retailing.

== Link Theory Holdings ==
Theory's owner, Link Theory Holdings (LTH), bought fashion house Helmut Lang from Prada and German fashion label Rosner in 2005. Rosner's European production and distribution network was to help expand the Theory label in the European market over the following few years. However, in the end of 2008, Link Theory sold Rosner to a German private equity firm reasoning that LTH was to penetrate the European market by means of their own European subsidiaries.

Theory is Link Theory's core brand. Other brands include Helmut Lang, PLS+T and footwear label Jean-Michel Cazabat. For the Japanese market, exclusive sub-labels of the Theory brand, such as 'Theory men', 'Theory luxe', 'Theory petit' have been created. Link Theory is headquartered in Aoyama, Tokyo.

== Stores ==
At the end of February 2016, Theory boasted a total of 489 stores (including franchise).

In North America, Theory has stores in Aspen, Atlanta, Aventura, Costa Mesa, Dallas -Highland Park Village, East Hampton, Greenwich, Westport, Los Angeles, New York City, Palm Beach, Philadelphia, Manchester, Vermont and San Francisco. The Theory label's headquarters and design offices are located in New York City's Meatpacking District, at 2 Gansevoort Street. The building also houses a Theory flagship store.

== Collaborations ==
In 2016, Theory pursued a collaboration with fellow fast-retailing brand Uniqlo touted under the slogan "Japanese engineering, New York Style." The collection was a capsule men's wardrobe featuring 4 different styles of shirts in 4 colors each and received widespread positive feedback for providing the same minimalist philosophy at a significantly lower price point.

In 2019, Theory formed an alliance with Girl-Up, a leadership initiative launched by the United Nations Foundation which aims to support leadership development plans that help every girl reach her potential. Accordingly, they introduced a unisex t-shirt to donate a percentage of sales to the initiative.

== Lawsuit ==
In 2006, Tahari sued his former partner Rosen (as well as Link Theory Holdings and Sasaki) for having urged Tahari to sell Theory at a price below its value to the Japanese in 2003, seeking damages and a share in the proceeds from the company's IPO in excess of $180 million. Rosen had also said that he would retire from the company within a year from the sale when, in fact, after Tahari's departure, he stayed on as the newly established company's president. Link Theory called Tahari's complaint "frivolous claims." Rosen labeled it "seller's remorse" and the case was later dismissed by a New York judge, even denying Tahari's claim for unpaid royalties by Theory's then Asian licensee, Link International.
