= Elie Tahari =

Israeli-American fashion designer (born 1952)

- אלי טהרי
- Born: January 21, 1952 (age 74)
- Occupation: Fashion designer
- Label: Elie Tahari
- Spouse: Rory Green (m. 2000; div. 2011)
- Children: Jeremey Tahari
- Awards: 2014 Fashion Group International Brand Vision Award
- Website: https://www.elietahari.com

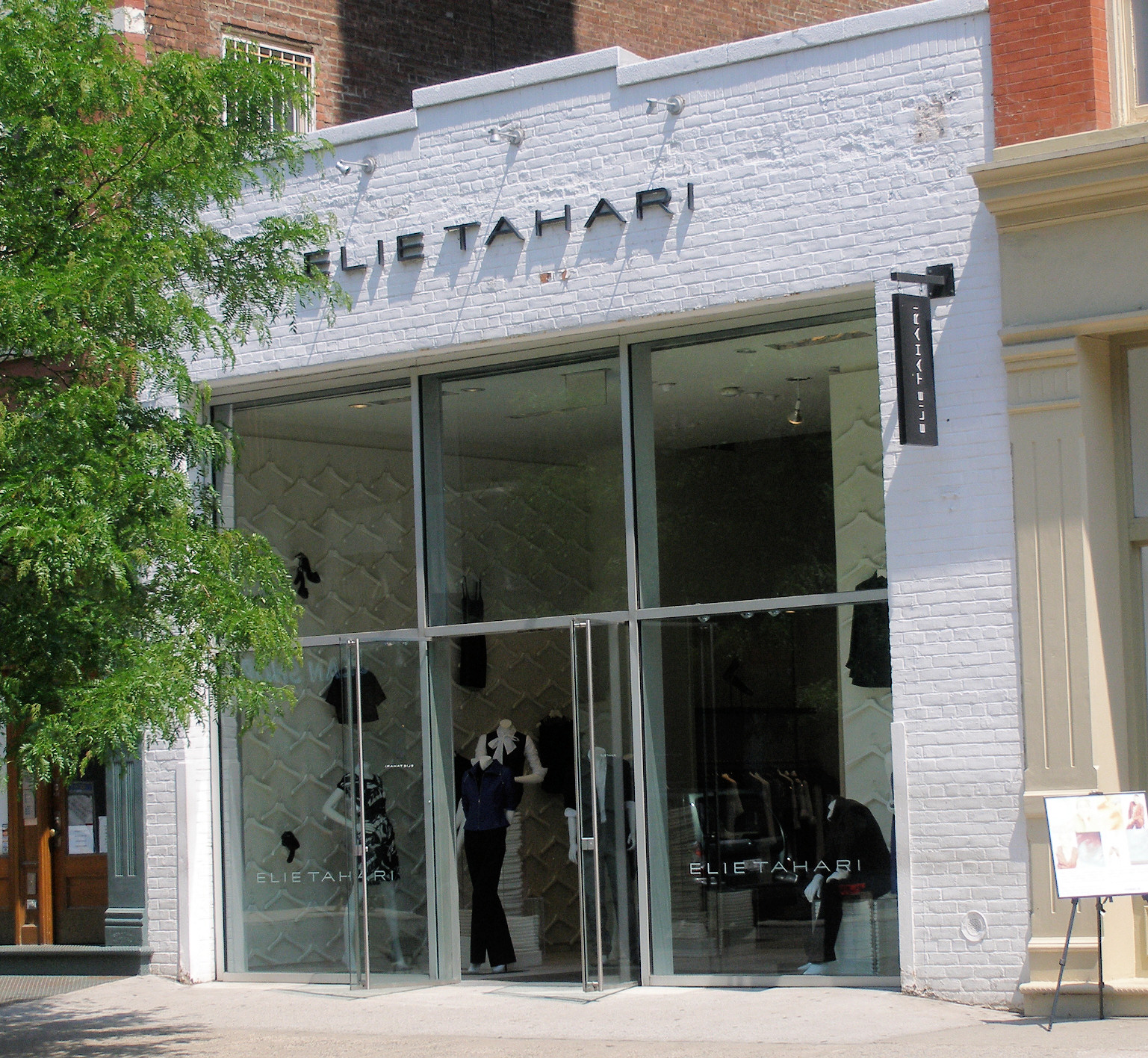
Tahari's boutique in the SoHo neighborhood of New York City

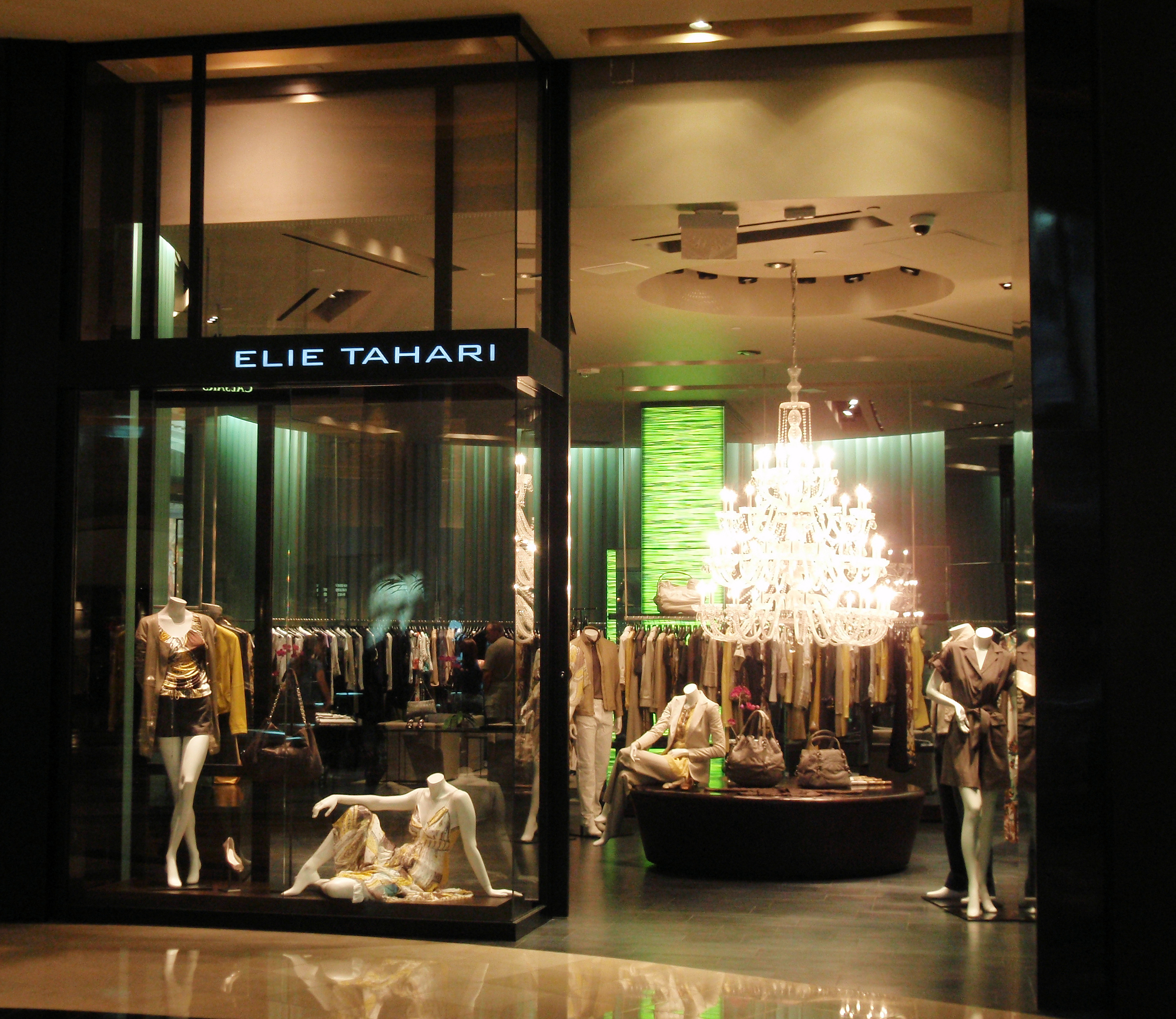
Tahari's boutique at The Forum Shops at Caesars in Las Vegas, Nevada

Elie Tahari (Hebrew: אלי טהרי; born 1952) is an Israeli-American fashion designer and entrepreneur. He is best known for founding the Elie Tahari ready-to-wear fashion brand and co-founding Theory. He is the chairman of Elie Tahari, Ltd. and his son Jeremey is CEO and creative director. His company is headquartered in New York City, with stores located throughout the world.

== Early life ==
Tahari was born in 1952, in Jerusalem to Iranian-Jewish immigrants. He has four sisters (Aliza, Diana, Shulie and Illana) and two brothers (Avraham and Yosi).

Tahari emigrated to the United States in 1971 with less than $100. Working as an electrician at a clothing boutique in the Garment District of New York City, he began designing his own clothing line after popularizing the iconic tube top in 1973. His namesake label, Tahari, launched in 1974 with a boutique located on Madison Avenue in New York City.

== Career ==
Tahari began working in New York City as an electrician in the Garment District. In 1973, Tahari helped popularize the tube top, which created the foundation for his entry into the fashion world.

In 1977, Tahari launched his namesake fashion label. His first fashion show was held at Studio 54 in New York City. In 1979, he opened his first boutique on Madison Avenue.

In the 1980s, Tahari turned his attention to the tailored suit, with more office-centric designs as women joined the workforce and the ranks of the business elite.

In 1989, he began selling his branded apparel to various luxury department stores, starting with Bloomingdale’s.

He was admitted to the Council of Fashion Designers of America in 1994. In 1997, he teamed with Andrew Rosen to launch the ready-to-wear label Theory.

In September 2003, Theory was sold to Link International for $100 million.

The 2000s saw an expansion of his brand into men's ready-to-wear, accessories, jewelry, footwear and home goods. In 2012, Tahari was a guest judge on the Lifetime television series Project Runway All Stars. He collaborated with Kohl's DesigNation in 2014 and launched ET Sport in 2015.

In 2019, Elie Tahari (as a brand, including both direct and licensed products) reached $1 billion in sales volume. The next year, the luxury department stores which he had collaborated with for thirty years were shuttered by the COVID-19 pandemic. As a result, Tahari decided to close his namesake brand's wholesale division and switched to a direct-to-consumer retail model (focused on his own branded boutique and outlet stores) with a strong e-commerce component.

In 2024, Elie Tahari celebrated the 50th anniversary of his brand.

== Awards and honors ==
- 2013 - Mayor Michael Bloomberg declared "Elie Tahari Day" in New York City in honor of his forty years in the fashion industry.
- 2014 - Ellis Island Medal of Honor
- 2014 - Brand Vision Award from the Fashion Group International
- 2021 - a documentary about Tahari's life, "The United States of Elie Tahari," was released and selected for over 100 film festivals.
