= Carl A. Swanson =

Swedish-American businessman (1879–1949)

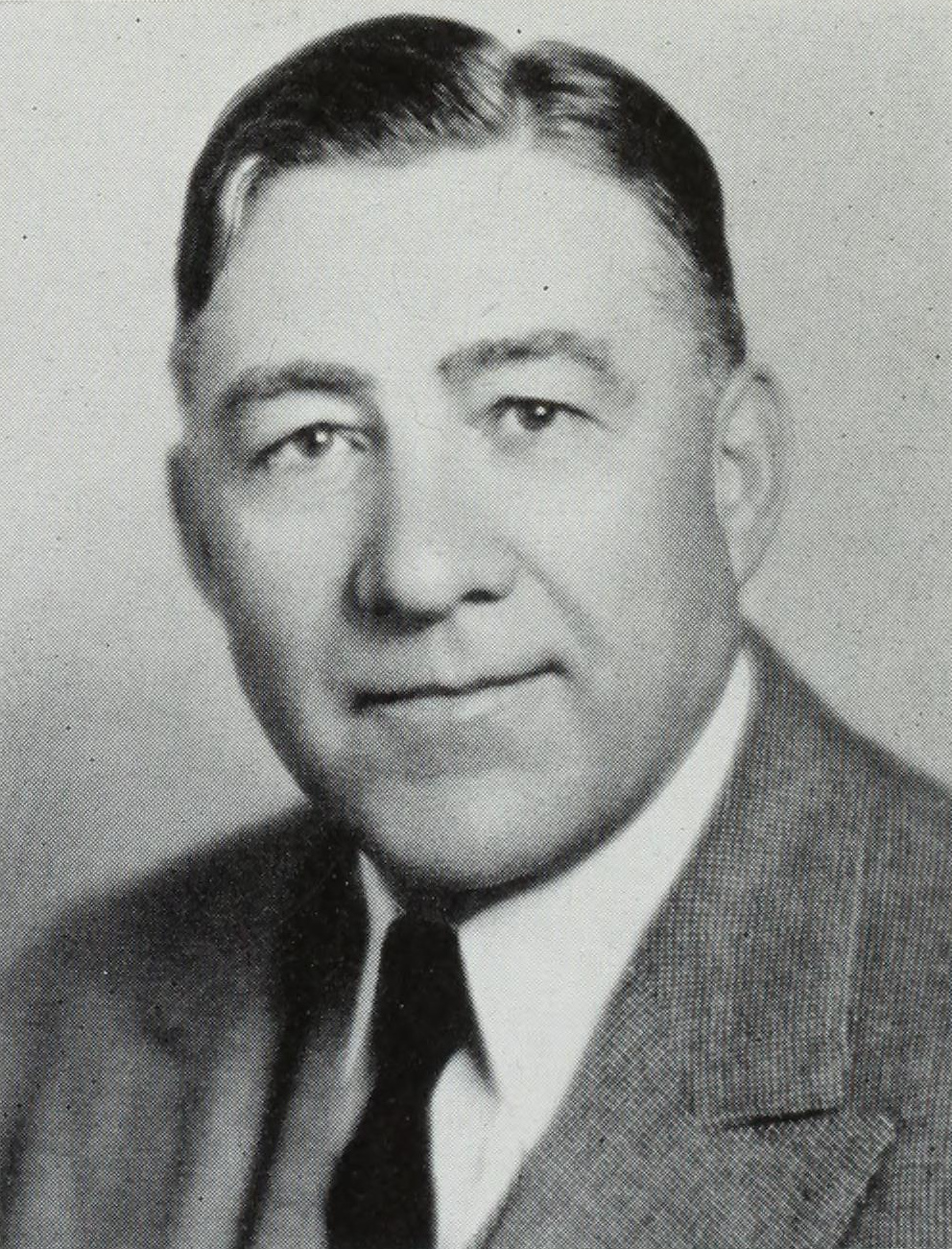
Carl A. Swanson

Carl Anton Swanson (May 1, 1879 – October 9, 1949) was a Swedish-American businessman, who was the founder of the U.S. national food production company Swanson.

== Background ==
Carl Anton Svensson was born in Karlskrona, Blekinge County, Sweden. He came to the United States in 1896 at the age of 17, arriving with a tag around his neck where it was written "Carl Swanson, Swedish. Send me to Omaha. I speak no English." He then settled in Omaha, Nebraska's community of immigrant Swedish-Americans.

== Career ==
In 1899, Swanson became a partner with John O. Jerpe in a small wholesale company. Jerpe Commission Company purchased eggs and cream from local farmers which they processed and sold. In 1905, Swanson bought the company from Jerpe under a partnership with John Hjerpe and Frank Ellison. They operated a commission business hauling eggs, milk and poultry they bought from local farmers and selling them to the grocery stores and hotels in Omaha, Nebraska. The enterprise was eventually incorporated. Frank Ellison died in 1918 and John Hjerpe in 1928. After John Hjerpe's death, Swanson became the sole owner of the corporation.

By 1938, the Swanson enterprise was one of the larger creameries in the United States and during World War II became a major supplier of poultry and egg products to the U.S. military. In 1945, the company's name was officially changed to C.A. Swanson and Sons. After Carl Swanson died in 1949, his two sons, Gilbert Carl (1906–1968) and W. Clarke Swanson, took over the company.

== Personal life ==
Carl Swanson was married to German-born immigrant Caroline Swanson (née Gerock). He was the father of Gilbert Carl Swanson, Walter Clarke Swanson, and Gretchen Velde.

Carl Swanson's noted descendants include, Veronica Swanson Beard, Tucker Carlson (by adoption) and in-laws, Dick Carlson, Charles H. Price II and Reed Jobs.

== Related Reading ==
- Allen, Gary J.; Ken Albala (2007) The Business of Food: Encyclopedia of the Food and Drink Industries (ABC-CLIO) ISBN 9780313337253
- Smith, Andrew F. (2011) Eating History: 30 Turning Points in the Making of American Cuisine (Columbia University Press) ISBN 9780231140935
