= Frozen meal =

Pre-packaged frozen prepared food

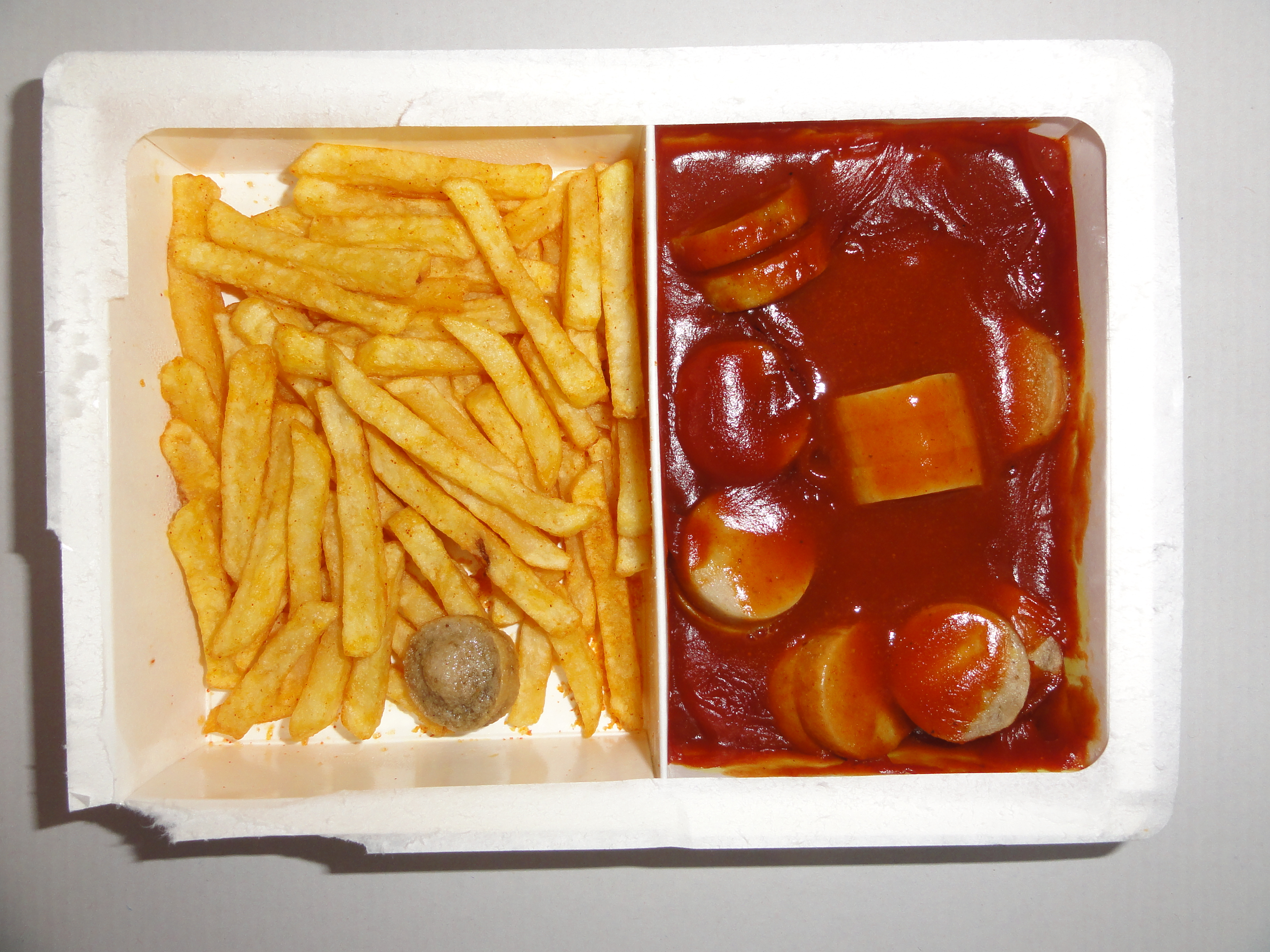
A German ready meal that has been heated: currywurst with fries

A frozen meal, also called a TV dinner (Canada and US), prepackaged meal, ready-made meal, ready meal (UK), frozen dinner, or microwave meal, is a meal portioned for an individual that is stored in a freezer and heated prior to serving. A frozen meal in the United States and Canada usually consists of a type of meat, fish, or pasta for the main course, and sometimes vegetables, potatoes, and/or a dessert. Frozen meals can include various cuisines, such as American, Indian, Chinese and Mexican.

The term TV dinner, which has become common, was first used as part of a brand of packaged meals developed in 1953 by the company C.A. Swanson & Sons. The original TV Dinner came in an aluminum tray and was heated in an oven. In the US and Canada, the term is synonymous with any packaged meal or dish ("dinner") purchased frozen in a supermarket and heated at home. In 1986, the Campbell Soup Company introduced the microwave-safe tray. Today, many frozen food trays are made of a microwaveable and disposable material, usually plastic or coated cardboard.

== History ==
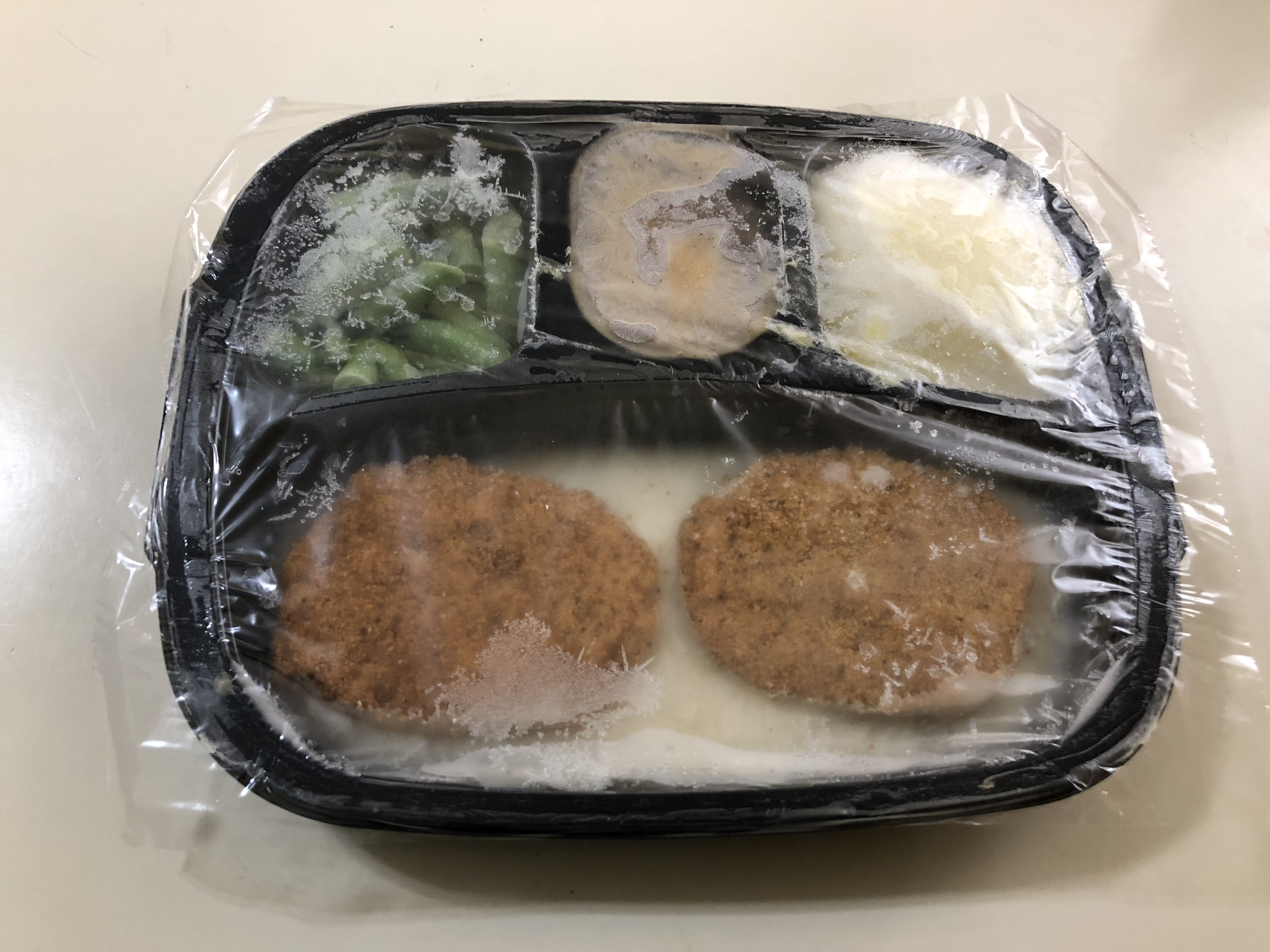
A frozen American TV dinner: Swanson "Hungry-Man Country Fried Chicken"

Several smaller companies had conceived of frozen dinners earlier (see Invention section below), but the first to achieve widespread and lasting success was Swanson. The first Swanson-brand TV Dinner was produced in the United States and consisted of a Thanksgiving meal of turkey, cornbread stuffing, frozen peas and sweet potatoes packaged in a tray like those used at the time for airline food service. Each item was placed in its own compartment. The trays proved to be useful: the entire dinner could be removed from the outer packaging as a unit, the tray with its aluminum foil covering could be heated directly in the oven without any extra dishes, and one could eat the meal directly from the tray. The product was cooked for 25 minutes at 425 °F (218 °C) and fit onto a TV tray table. The original TV Dinner sold for 98 cents, and had a first production run of 5,000 dinners.

The name "TV dinner" was coined by Gerry Thomas, often considered its inventor. In an interview long after the product's introduction, Thomas noted how televisions were "magic" status symbols, and he thought the name "TV dinner" could attach the attributes of a popular medium to a convenient food item. Another source postulates that the box of the TV dinner was made to look like a television, and that TV trays (folding tray table furniture) soon appeared on the market.

Much has changed since the first TV dinners were marketed. For instance, a wider variety of main courses – such as fried chicken, spaghetti, Salisbury steak and Mexican combinations – have been introduced. Competitors such as Banquet and Morton began offering prepackaged frozen dinners, too. Other changes include:

- 1960 – Swanson added desserts (such as apple cobbler and brownies) to a new four-compartment tray.
- 1969 – The first Swanson TV breakfasts were marketed. Great Starts Breakfasts and breakfast sandwiches (such as egg and Canadian bacon) followed later.
- 1973 – The first Swanson "Hungry-Man" dinners were marketed; these contained larger portions of its regular dinners. The American football player "Mean" Joe Greene was the "Hungry-Man" spokesman.
- 1986 – The first microwave oven-safe trays were marketed.

Modern-day frozen dinners tend to come in microwave-safe containers. Product lines also tend to offer a larger variety of dinner types. These dinners, also known as microwave meals, can be purchased at most supermarkets. They are stored frozen. To prepare them, the plastic cover is removed or vented, and the meal is heated in a microwave oven for a few minutes. They are convenient since they essentially require no preparation time other than the heating, although some frozen dinners may require the preparer to briefly carry out an intermediate step (such as stirring mashed potatoes midway through the heating cycle) to ensure adequate heating and uniform consistency of component items.

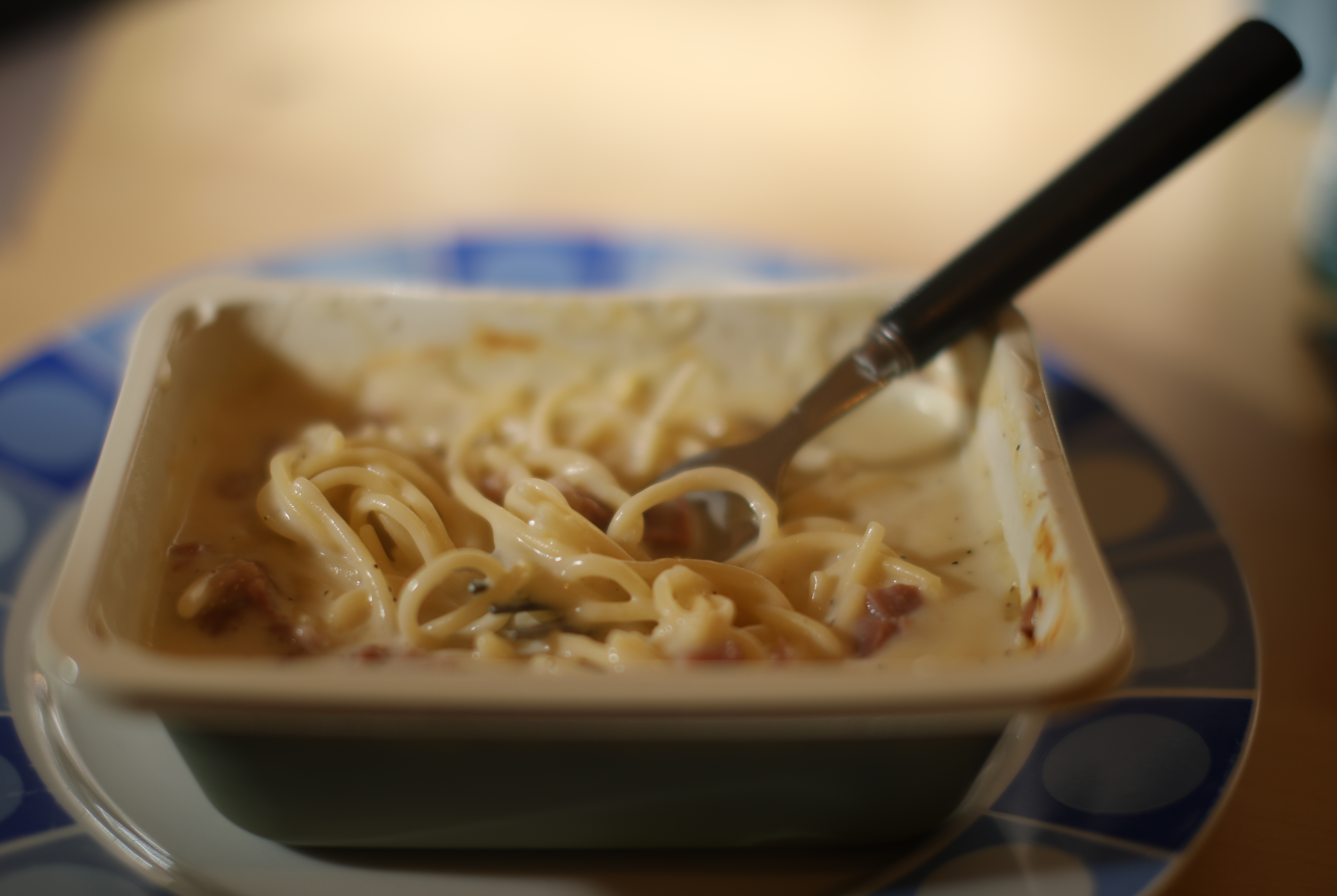
A British ready meal after being microwaved: spaghetti carbonara

In the United Kingdom, prepared frozen meals first became widely available in the late 1970s. Since then they have steadily grown in popularity with the increased ownership of home freezers and microwave ovens. Demographic trends such as the growth of smaller households have also influenced the sale of this and other types of convenience food. In 2003, the United Kingdom spent £5 million a day on ready meals, and was the largest consumer in Europe.

Unfrozen pre-cooked ready meals, which are merely chilled and require less time to reheat, are also popular and are sold by most supermarkets. Chilled ready meals are intended for immediate reheating and consumption. Although most can be frozen by the consumer after purchase, they can either be heated from frozen or may have to be fully defrosted before reheating.

Many different varieties of frozen and chilled ready meals are now generally available in the UK, including "gourmet" recipes, organic and vegetarian dishes, traditional British and foreign cuisine, and smaller children's meals.

== Invention ==
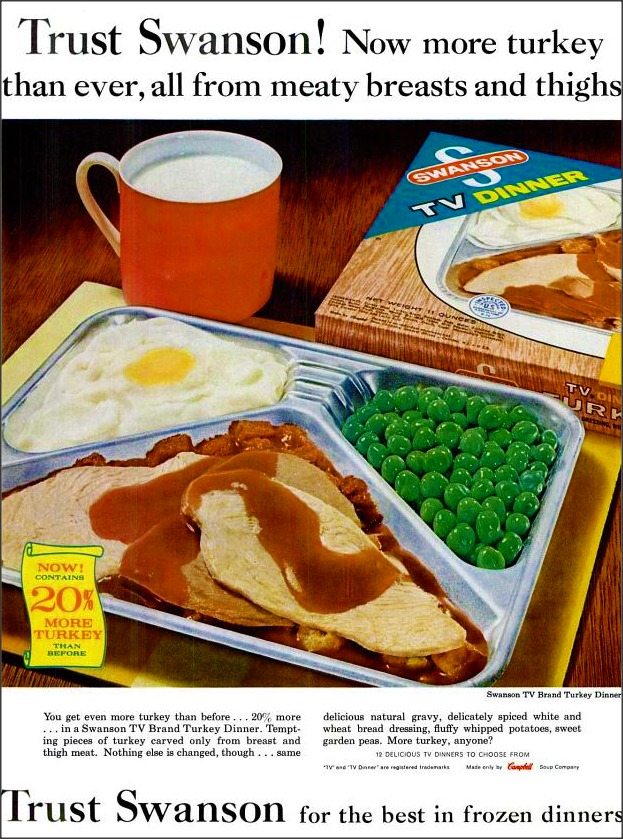
Swanson TV dinner ad from 1963

The identity of the TV Dinner's inventor has been disputed. In one account, first publicized in 1996, retired Swanson executive Gerry Thomas said he conceived the idea after the company found itself with a huge surplus of frozen turkeys because of poor Thanksgiving sales. Thomas' version of events has been challenged by the Los Angeles Times, members of the Swanson family and former Swanson employees. They credit the Swanson brothers with the invention.

Betty Cronin, a bacteriologist employed at C. A. Swanson and Sons, has also been credited with important contributions to the invention. She was involved in the technical design of dinner items that could be frozen and re-heated successfully.

Swanson's concept was not original:

- In 1944, William L. Maxson's frozen dinners served on disposable, compartmentalised, coated paper plates, labelled Strato-Plates, were being served by the military and on airplanes.
- In 1948, plain frozen fruits and vegetables were joined by what were then called 'dinner plates' with a main course, potato, and vegetables.
- In 1948, Jack Fisher formed a company called FridgiDinners to supply bars and taverns with “just reheat” wares.
- In 1949 Albert and Meyer Bernstein formed the Pittsburgh based Frozen Dinners Inc. to sell frozen dinners, on compartmentalised aluminum dinner trays; by 1950 they had sold in excess of 400,000 dinners.
- In 1952, the first consumer-marketed frozen dinners on oven-ready aluminum trays were introduced by Quaker State Foods under the One-Eyed Eskimo label, and by 1954 the company sold 2 million such dinners annually. Quaker State Foods was joined by other companies including Philadelphia-based Frigi-Dinner, which offered such fare as beef stew with corn and peas, veal goulash with peas and potatoes, and chicken chow mein with egg rolls and fried rice. Swanson, a large producer of canned and frozen poultry in Omaha, Nebraska, was able to promote the widespread sales and adaptation of frozen dinner by using its nationally recognized brand name with an extensive national marketing campaign nicknamed "Operation Smash" and the clever advertising name of "TV Dinner," which tapped into the public's excitement around the television.

== Manufacturing ==
The production process of frozen meals is highly automated and undergoes three major steps. Those steps are food preparation, tray loading, and freezing. During food preparation, vegetables and fruits are usually placed on a movable belt and washed, then are placed into a container to be steamed or boiled for 1–3 minutes. This process is referred to as blanching, and is used as a method to destroy enzymes in the food that can cause chemical changes negatively affecting overall flavor and color of the fruit and vegetables. As for meats, prior to cooking, they are trimmed of fat and cut into proper sizes. The fish is usually cleaned and cut into fillets, and poultry is usually washed thoroughly and dressed. Meats are then seasoned, placed on trays, and cooked in an oven for a predetermined amount of time. After all the food is ready to be packaged, it is sent to the filling lines. The food is placed in its compartments as the trays pass under numerous filling machines; to ensure that every packaged dinner gets an equal amount of food, the filling devices are strictly regulated.

The food undergoes a process of cryogenic freezing with liquid nitrogen. After the food is placed on the conveyor belt, it is sprayed with liquid nitrogen that boils on contact with the freezing food. This method of flash-freezing fresh foods is used to retain the natural quality of the food. When the food is chilled through cryogenic freezing, small ice crystals are formed throughout the food that, in theory, can preserve the food indefinitely if stored safely. Cryogenic freezing is widely used as it is a method for rapid freezing, requires almost no dehydration, excludes oxygen thus decreasing oxidative spoilage, and causes less damage to individual freezing pieces. Due to the fact that the cost of operating cryogenic freezing is high, it is commonly used for high value food products such as TV dinners, which is a $4.5 billion industry a year that is continuing to grow with the constant introduction of new technology.

Following this, the dinners are either covered with aluminum foil or paper, and the product is tightly packed with a partial vacuum created to ensure no evaporation takes place that can cause the food to dry out. Then the packaged dinners are placed in a refrigerated storage facility, transported by refrigerated truck, and stored in the grocer's freezer. TV dinners prepared with the aforementioned steps—that is, frozen and packaged properly—can remain in near-perfect condition for a long time, so long as they are stored at −18 °C (0 °F) during shipping and storage.

== Health concerns ==
Frozen meals are often heavily processed with extra salt and fat to make foods last longer. In addition, stabilizing the product for a long period typically means that companies will use partially hydrogenated vegetable oils for some items (typically dessert). Partially hydrogenated vegetable oils are high in trans fats and are shown to adversely affect cardiovascular health. The dinners are almost always significantly less nutritious than fresh food and are formulated to remain edible after long periods of storage, thus often requiring preservatives such as butylated hydroxytoluene. There is, however, some variability between brands.

In recent years there has been a push by a number of independent manufacturers and retailers to make meals that are low in salt and fat and free of artificial additives. In the UK, most British supermarkets also produce their own "healthy eating" brands. Nearly all chilled or frozen ready meals sold in the UK are now clearly labeled with the salt, sugar and fat content and the recommended daily intake. In Quebec and Canada, companies need to label all products exceeding a fixed limit of sodium and fat. Concern about obesity and government publicity initiatives such as those by the Food Standards Agency and the National Health Service have encouraged manufacturers to reduce the levels of salt and fat in ready prepared food.

== See also ==
- Banquet Foods
- Bento
- Field ration
- Freezer Queen
- Frozen pizza
