= Verónica Zurita =

Ecuadorian politician

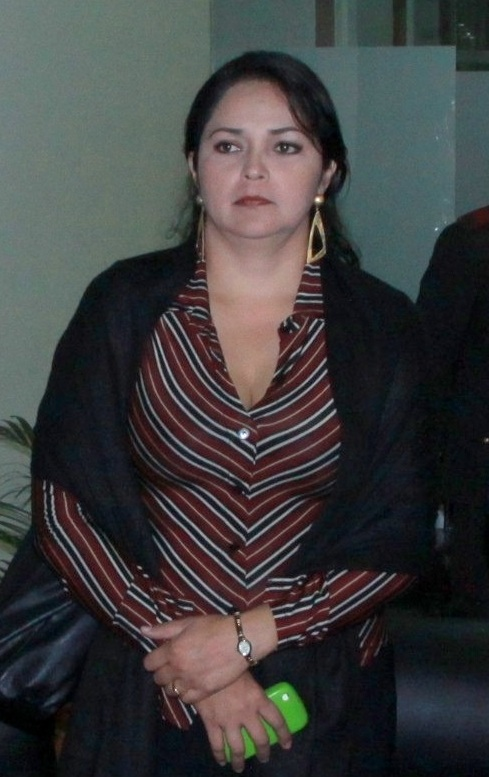

Mayor of Santo Domingo
- In office 2009–2014
- Preceded by: Kléber Paz y Miño
- Succeeded by: Víctor Quirola

Council of Santo Domingo
- In office 2002–2004

Personal details
- Born: 10 January 1974 (age 52) Santo Domingo, Ecuador
- Party: Movimiento Alianza País
- Education: UTE University

Verónica Zurita Castro (born 10 January 1974) is an Ecuadorian politician. She was the first female mayor of Santo Domingo, Ecuador.

== Biography ==
Verónica Zurita was born in Santo Domingo, Ecuador on 10 January 1974. She completed her secondary studies at the Calazacón School and studied at the Equator Technological University and graduated with a degree in agricultural engineering. She also obtained a master's degree in business administration and a diploma in management in provincial government. Prior to entering politics, she was the manager of the Terrestrial Terminal in Santo Domingo and a professor at the UTE.

In 2002, Zurita was elected to the city council of Santo Domingo representing the Democratic Left Party. In 2004, Zurita resigned from her seat so as to stand for election for the Mayoral office of the city, but lost with 31% of the vote against Kléber Paz y Miño, who successfully sought reelection.

In the 2009 provincial elections, Zurita was finally elected mayor representing the PAIS Alliance, making her the first woman to become Mayor of Santo Domingo. Her mayoralty was characterized by the improvement of infrastructure and the providing of drinking water and improved plumbing for the city.
