= Veronica Gonzalez Peña =

American writer and filmmaker

Veronica Gonzalez Peña is an American writer and filmmaker, and is a faculty member at Stetson University, Florida.

== Biography ==
In 2006 she founded rockypoint Press, a series of artist/writer collaborative prints, books, and films.

Gonzalez Peña's 2007 novel twin time: or how death befell me won the Premio Aztlán Literary Prize in 2008. Her book on the Mexican drug war, So Far From God was part of the semiotext(e) exhibition in the 2014 Whitney Biennial.

Since 2013, Gonzalez Peña has moved into increasingly performative work, writing scripts for films she directs and produces. Her first play, Neck of the Woods, premiered in Manchester 2015, and starred Charlotte Rampling and Hélène Grimaud. Her films include On Becoming, with Michael Silverblatt, Chris Kraus, and Hedi El Kholti and Cordelia, with Michel Auder, Pat Steir, and Alice Zimmerman. Her documentary Pat Steir: Artist premiered at the Film Society of Lincoln Center's New York Jewish Film Festival in 2019. She is currently working on a documentary about Lawrence Weiner.

== Bibliography ==
- Juncture, 2003 (Soft Skull Press). ISBN 1887128913
- twin time: or, how death befell me, 2007 (Semiotext(e)). ISBN 1584350482
- The Sad Passions, 2013 (Semiotext(e)). ISBN 1584351209
- So Far From God, 2014 (Semiotext(e)). ISBN 1584351543

== Filmography ==
- Like a Shadow (2013), 38 minutes
- On Becoming (2014), 49 minutes
- Cordelia (2015), 75 minutes
- Pat Steir: Artist (2019), 74 minutes
