= Verónica Martínez de la Vega =

Mexican mathematician

Verónica Martínez de la Vega y Mansilla is a Mexican mathematician whose research involves topology and hypertopology. She is a researcher in the Institute of Mathematics at the National Autonomous University of Mexico (UNAM).

== Education and career ==
Martínez de la Vega was born in Mexico City, on January 5, 1971. Her family worked as lawyers, and discouraged her from going into science, but nevertheless she ended up studying mathematics at UNAM, and wrote an undergraduate thesis in topology that she published as a journal paper in Topology and its Applications. Continuing to graduate study in topology at UNAM, she completed her PhD in 2002 with the dissertation Estudio sobre dendroides y compactaciones supervised by Polish topologist Janusz J. Charatonik, becoming his only female doctoral student.

After postgraduate research at UAM Iztapalapa and California State University, Sacramento, she joined the Institute of Mathematics as a researcher in 2005.

== Recognition ==
Martínez de la Vega is a member of the Mexican Academy of Sciences. In 2017 UNAM gave her their Sor Juana Inés de la Cruz Recognition.
