= Housata =

- Directed by: Karel Smyczek
- Written by: Irena Charvátová; Karel Smyczek
- Starring: Yvetta Kornová
- Cinematography: Jirí Kolín
- Edited by: Antonín Strojsa
- Release date: 1 January 1980
- Running time: 73 minutes
- Country: Czechoslovakia
- Language: Czech

Housata is a Czech drama film directed by Karel Smyczek. It was released in 1980.

== Cast ==
- Yvetta Kornová - Marie
- Jaromíra Mílová - Sarka
- Veronika Gajerová
- Svatava Rádková
- Irena Visnarová
- Bozena Blahosová
- Dagmar Veselá
- Miroslava Vydrová
- Eva Vrbová
- Lenka Dandová
- Veronika Jeníková
- Jaromír Dulava
- Jirí Pistek
- Jana Vanková - Markova
- Marika Dolezalová
