= Veronica Perrule Dobson =

Eastern Arrernte linguist, educator, elder, Traditional Owner, author and ecologist

Veronica Perrule Dobson AM (born 1944) is an Eastern Arrernte linguist, educator, elder, Traditional Owner, author and ecologist. She is instrumental in establishing Eastern Arrernte as a written language.

Veronica Dobson at Anthwerrke (Emily Gap), east of Alice Springs, in 2011, with remnant Angelthe (Bush pear, Cynanchum floribundum) plant

== Early life ==
Veronica was born at Arltunga, Central Australia, in 1944. She lived on the Arltunga Mission for approximately 10 years. Her family re-located to Lytentye Apurte (Santa Teresa) mission then she moved to Alice Springs at the age of 16 where she worked in domestic service and in some of the local factories.

== Career ==
Veronica has worked as a translator, interpreter and educator of the Arrernte language and culture for many years. She co-authored Eastern and central Arrernte to English dictionary, to establish Arrernte as a written language and has written educational materials for teaching the language. She was a pioneer in the development of Arrernte language curriculum materials at Yipirinya, an indigenous school in Alice Springs.

Veronica is a botanist and ecologist drawing on her vast knowledge of Arrernte culture, local plants and their uses. She knows the food and medicines of the Arrernte lands intimately and has co-authored books on botany and worked with scientists on projects about plants, water quality, bush fire management, Arrente concepts of relatedness, the Native Seed Bank, and has contributed to a number of reports and papers on indigenous ecology. She has worked with staff of Central Land Council, NT Parks and Wildlife and CSIRO. She helped establish the bush medicine garden at the Olive Pink Botanic Garden and the Alice Springs Desert Park in central Australia. She served on The Merne Altyerre-ipenhe (Food from the Creation Time) Reference Group advising on ethical guidelines for the bush foods industry in central Australia. She also was a senior advisor on the Indigemoji app launched in 2019.

She has been awarded for her community service as a teacher and research collaborator. She often shares her natural history knowledge with the public.

== Works ==
- Dobson, Veronica (1983), Anwerne alheke yerrampeke = We went for honeyants, School of Australian Linguistics
- Dobson, Veronica (1984), Ingkwerlpe, nthakenbe iteme = How Aboriginal prepared bush tobacco, School of Australian Linguistics
- Henderson, John (John Keith); Dobson, Veronica; Institute for Aboriginal Development (Alice Springs, N.T.) (1994), Eastern and central Arrernte to English dictionary, IAD Press, ISBN 978-0-949659-74-3
- Dobson, Veronica; Riley, Rosalie; McCormack, Jeanette; Hartman, Debbie (1997), "Interactions Across the Generations - Australia: Learning from Elders", Australian Journal of Indigenous Education, 25 (2): 24–26, doi:10.1017/S1326011100002738, ISSN 1326-0111, S2CID 146170623
- Dobson, Veronica; Nano, Ada (2005), Apmere apwerte urrtharenye-kenhe: the country of the limestone people, Report to Central Land Council and Northern Territory Parks and Wildlife Service Alice Springs, Australia
- Dobson, Veronica (2007), Arelhe-Kenhe Merrethene : Arrernte traditional healing, IAD Press, ISBN 978-1-86465-033-4
- Dobson, Veronica (narrator); Walsh, Fiona (director); Sati, Wiriya (camera, editor) (2008), Anpernirrentye Relationships between bush foods, creation laws, people, country and all things: illustrated by three plants, video 13 min 25 sec, CSIRO and Desert Knowledge Ninti One CRC, Alice Springs
- Turner, Margaret Kemarre; McDonald, Barry Matthew John, (author.); Dobson, Veronica, (contributor.) (2010), Iwenhe tyerrtye : what it means to be an Aboriginal person, Alice Springs, N.T. IAD Press, ISBN 978-1-86465-095-2
- Dobson, Veronica; Henderson, John, (author.) (2013), Anpernirrentye kin and skin : talking about family in Arrernte, Alice Springs, N.T. IAD Press, ISBN 978-1-86465-130-0
- Walsh, Fiona; Dobson, Veronica; Douglas, Josie (2013), "Anpernirrentye a framework for enhanced application of indigenous ecological knowledge in natural resource management", Ecology and Society, 18 (3): 18 pages, doi:10.5751/ES-05501-180318, hdl:10535/9167
- Turpin, Myfany; Dobson, Veronica Perrurle; Turner, MK; Ross, Alison (2013), "The spotted nightjar calls when dingo pups are born: Ecological and Social Indicators in Central Australia", Journal of Ethnobiology, 33 (1): 7–32, doi:10.2993/0278-0771-33.1.7, S2CID 85568992
- Dobson, Veronica; Turner, MK; Woods, Gail; Turpin, Myfany (2009) Thipele arle ileme akerte. Things that birds let you know about, posters

== Awards ==
- 2011 Member of the Order of Australia for her services to the Indigenous Community as an Arrernte elder and traditional owner, as a linguist, naturalist and ecologist, and for the preservation of Aboriginal language and culture in Central Australia.
- 2011 Northern Territory Research and Innovation Award co-recipient of Desert Knowledge Award with Myra Ah Chee, M Kemarre Turner, Lorna Wilson, Rayleen Brown, Bess Price, Gina Smith, Maree Meredith, Josie Douglas and Fiona Walsh
- 2013 Companion of the Charles Darwin University
- 2015 NAIDOC Female Elder of the Year
- 2020 Honoree, Webby Awards for Indigemoji
- 2020 Honorary Mention, Prix Ars Electronica for Indigemoji
- 2020 Best Digital Product, First Nations Media Awards for Indigemoji
