= Veronica Openibo =

Nigerian religious sister

Veronica Openibo (born January 17, 1951) is a Nigerian religious sister and the Superior General of the congregation of the Sisters of the Holy Child Jesus.

== Life ==
Veronica Openibo was born on January 17, 1951, in Lagos, Nigeria. She grew up as the second of twelve children in a devout Catholic family.

She joined the Sisters of the Holy Child Jesus in September 1973. In 1975, she made her first religious vows and continued her studies. Veronica graduated in English in 1979 and pursued further religious studies in Jos.

When the African province of the congregation of the Sisters of the Holy Child Jesus was established, Veronica became its first African president, serving from 1986 to 1992.

From 2001 to 2010, Veronica played a role in the formation of her Nigerian community and served as a teacher of trainers in Jos. She also organized and hosted conferences on affectivity and sexual education. One of her main focuses is raising awareness about the suffering of women subjected to male domination.

In 2010, Veronica was elected as the superior general of her congregation, marking a significant milestone in her career. She was re-elected to serve a second six-year term in 2016. Currently based in the mother house of her community in Rome, Veronica leads alongside six other sisters.

== Advocacy for transparency and truth ==
Veronica gained international attention for her strong intervention during the summit at the Vatican for the protection of minors on February 23, 2019. In her speech, she passionately called for increased transparency in the Church and urged a shift "from scandal to truth."
