= Jean-Michel Cazabat =

French shoe designer

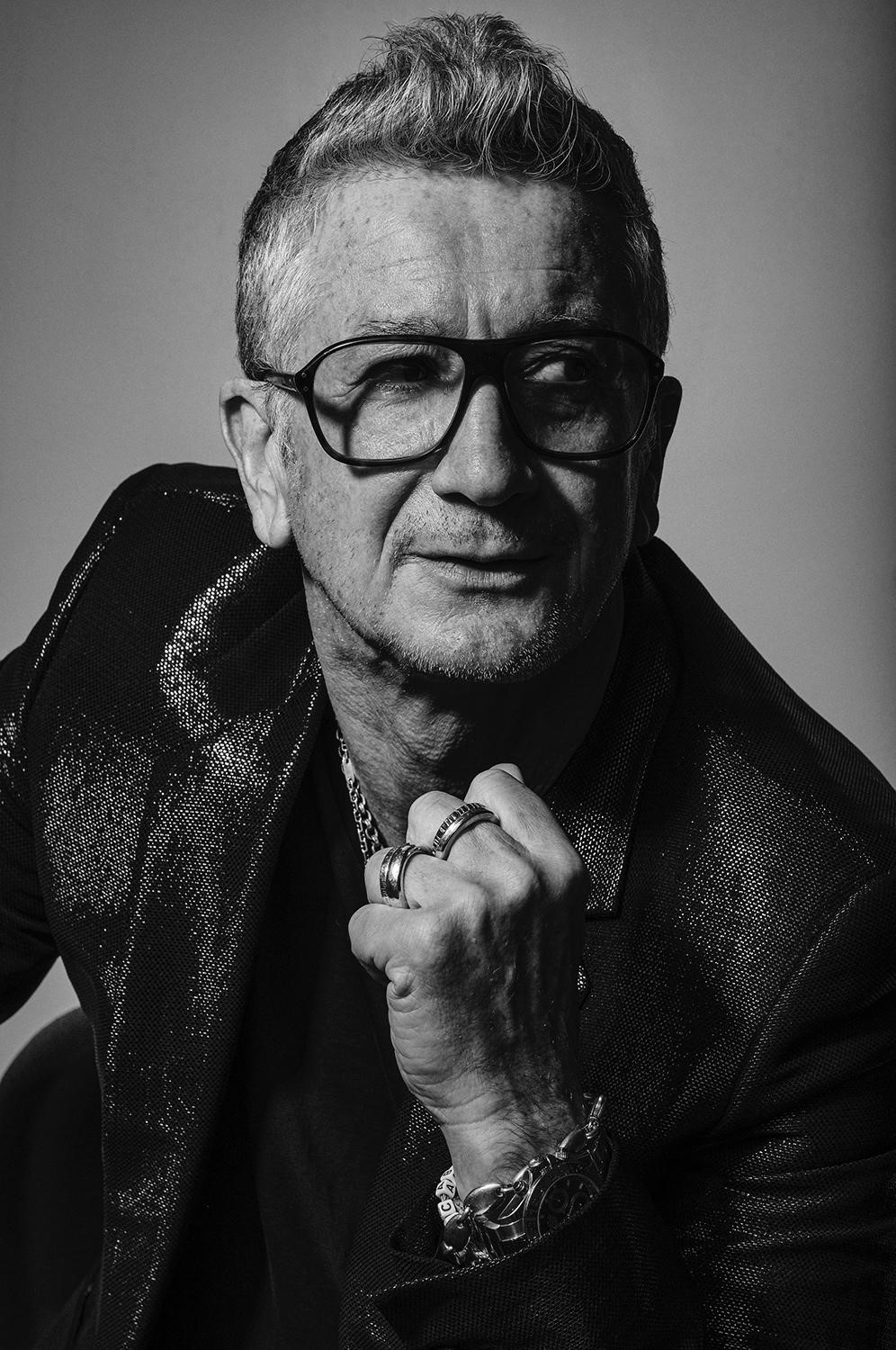
- Born: May 18, 1959; Bordères-sur-l'Echez
- Occupation: shoe designer

Jean-Michel Cazabat (born May 18, 1959, in Bordères-sur-l'Echez) is a French shoe designer. Miley Cyrus, Kristen Stewart, Sarah Jessica Parker, Kourtney Kardashian, and Lenny Kravitz have worn shoes designed by him.

His career began in the 1980s alongside Charles Jourdan and Stéphane Kélian. Cazabat eventually launched his eponymous brand in 2000 in New York.

== Biography ==
Cazabat was born May 18, 1959, in Bordères-sur-l'Echez, France. At 17, he covered rugby matches and concerts in the Southwest region of France as a correspondent for La Dépêche du Midi and La Nouvelle République des Pyrénées.

As a freelance photographer, he moved to Paris where he worked for Vogue, L'Officiel, and Le Figaro Magazine.

Jean-Michel began his design career in the 1980s when he became a buyer and store manager for Charles Jourdan in 1980. In 1985, he moved to New York, where Stéphane Kélian appointed him the American market director. Later, he was appointed creative director of the brand.

In 2000, Cazabat established his eponymous brand in New York, departing from his prior associations with fashion houses. In 2008, he partnered with the Max Oriental group to expand his business.

In 2011, he joined the Council of Fashion Designers of America (CFDA) and opened his first boutiques in New York and a shop-in-shop in Shanghai, China.

In 2019, Cazabat co-founded the vegan shoe brand Aera.
