= Veronica Dunne =

Veronica Dunne may refer to:

- Veronica Dunne (actor), actress from K.C. Undercover
- Veronica Dunne (soprano) (1927–2021), Irish opera singer and singing teacher
