= Verónica Pérez Fernández =

Spanish politician (born 1978)

Verónica Pérez MP
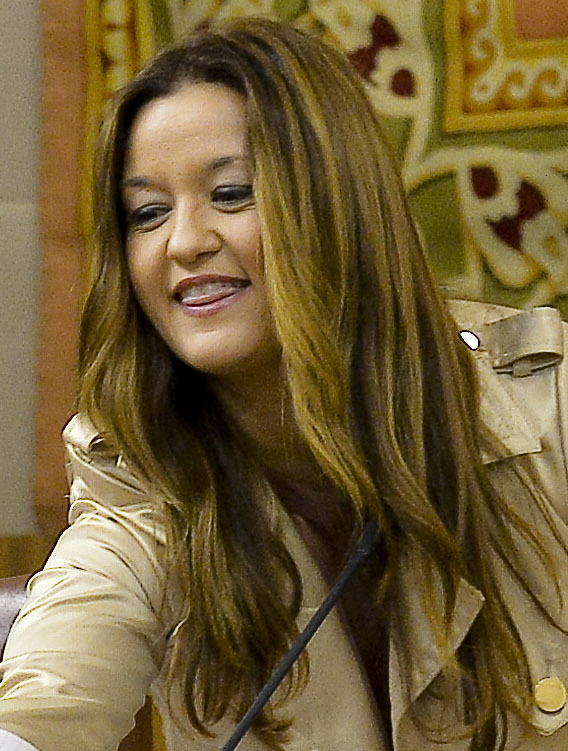
- Fernández in 2015

First Secretary of the Andalusian Parliament
- Incumbent
- Assumed office 16 April 2015
- Preceded by: Patricia del Pozo Fernández

Member of Parliament of Andalusia
- Incumbent
- Assumed office 14 March 2004
- Constituency: Sevilla

City councilor of San Juan de Aznalfarache
- In office 13 June 1999 – 14 March 2004

Personal details
- Born: June 21, 1978 (age 48) San Juan de Aznalfarache, Andalusia, Spain
- Party: Spanish Socialist Worker's Party
- Occupation: Politician

Verónica Pérez Fernández (born 21 June 1978) is a Spanish politician, general secretary of the PSOE of Seville and member of the Parliament of Andalusia since 2004.

== Biography ==
Born on 21 June 1978, in San Juan de Aznalfarache, her relationship with the PSOE began at age 14 in the Socialist Youth, joining the PSOE at age 18. Since then she has held various positions as Secretary of the Environment and Regional Planning of the PSOE—A in the period 2004–2008. Between 1999 and 2005, she was councilor of the City Council of San Juan de Aznalfarache and is also a provincial deputy since 2004. In the regional elections of 2004, she was elected deputy for the province of Seville in the Parliament of Andalusia, position that she renews in the elections of 2008, 2012 and 2015. In December 2013, she was elected secretary general of the PSOE of Seville in substitution of Susana Díaz when she assumed the presidency of the Junta de Andalucía and the general secretariat of the PSOE-A. Since 16 April 2015, she is the first secretary of the Andalusian Parliament.

On 29 September 2016, during the 2016 PSOE crisis while she was the President of the Federal Committee of the national party stood at the door of the headquarters of the national party and said "At this moment, the only authority in the PSOE is me".
