= Swanson =

American food brand

Swanson Frozen Foods/Broths
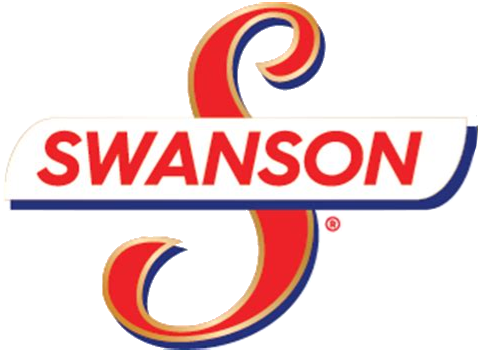
- Type: Private
- Founded: c. 1899; 127 years ago in Omaha, Nebraska
- Founder: Carl A. Swanson
- Fate: Acquired by Campbell's in 1955, became a brand
- Headquarters: Parsippany, New Jersey, U.S.
- Products: Frozen food, broth
- Owner: Campbell's
- Website: campbells.com/swanson

Swanson is a brand of TV dinners, broths, and canned poultry made for the North American and Hong Kong markets. The former Swanson Company was founded in Omaha, Nebraska, where it developed improvements of the frozen dinner. The TV dinner business is currently owned by Conagra Brands, while the broth business is currently owned by the Campbell Soup Company. TV dinner products currently sold under the brand include Swanson's Classics TV dinners and pot pies, and the current broth lineup includes chicken broth and beef broth.

== History ==
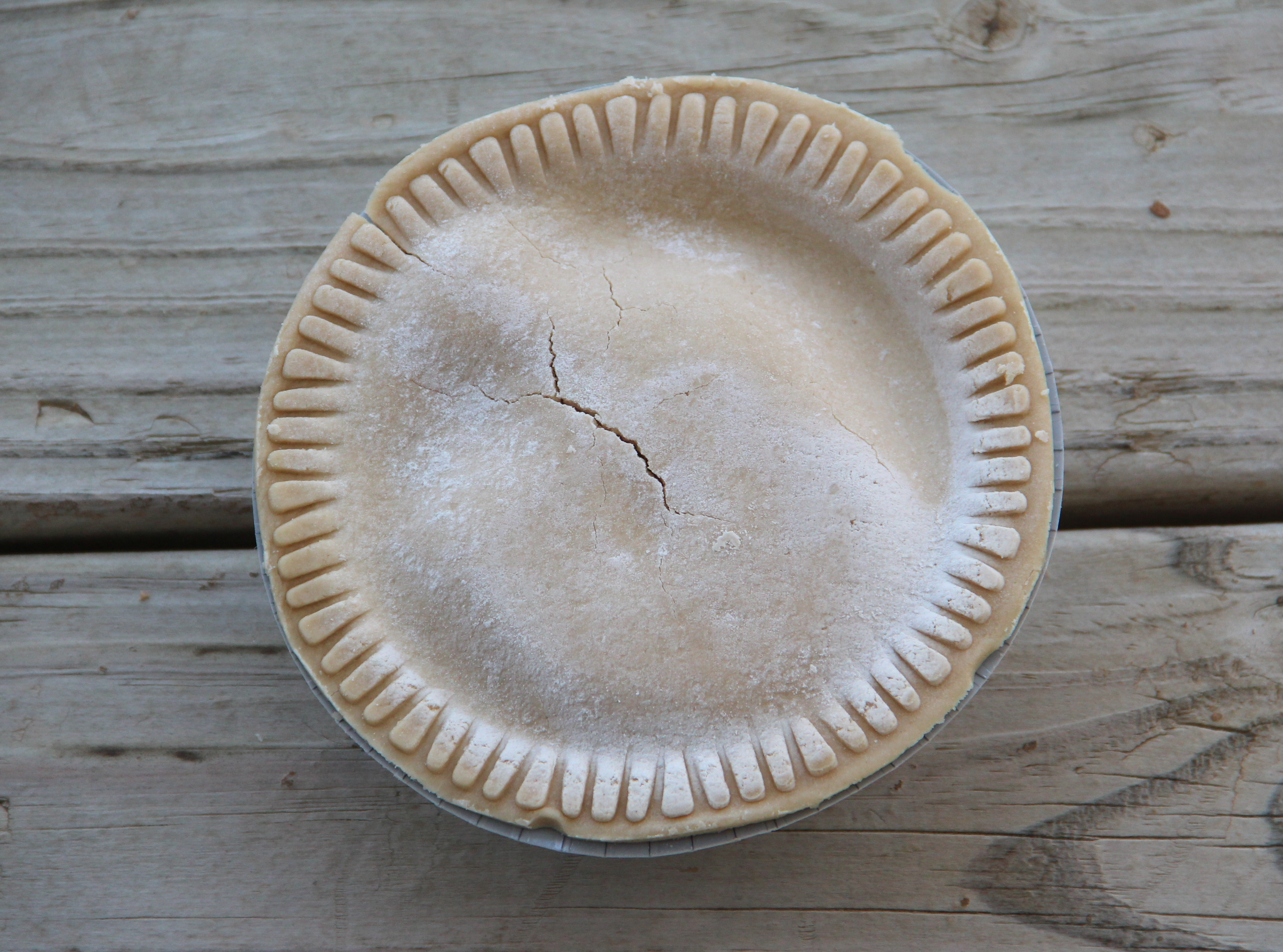
Swanson chicken pot pie

Carl A. Swanson (1879–1949) was a Swedish immigrant who worked on a farm in Blair, Nebraska, until he moved to Omaha. There, he worked in a grocery store where he came into contact with John O. Jerpe, who owned a small commission company, in which Swanson would become a partner in 1899. Initially, the Jerpe Commission Company purchased eggs and cream from local farmers. In turn, they processed the eggs, made butter from the cream, and sold these products to distributors and charged a commission to the farmers. With Swanson as a partner in the company, it began to expand. The Jerpe Commission Company began to sell chicken, turkey, and other meat. Swanson eventually bought the company from Jerpe and renamed it C.A. Swanson and Sons, as his sons Gilbert and Clarke had joined the business.

=== World War II ===
The frozen food industry began to dramatically change surrounding the time of World War II. As men were required on the battlefield, women became more needed in the workforce. This limited the amount of available time women could spend preparing meals for their children. Women began to rely on frozen meals post-war for greater convenience, and to save time.

=== Frozen dinners ===
Carl Swanson died in 1949, and his sons Gilbert C. and W. Clarke took over the company. One year later, in 1950, the Swanson brothers initially began manufacturing frozen oven-ready chicken and turkey pot pies in aluminum trays. They branched into full meals after Swanson executive Gerry Thomas visited the distributor of a company that specialized in preparing food for airlines. The company packed the food in aluminum trays which could be heated in a conventional oven. Thomas proposed this idea to the Swanson brothers, suggesting they create an aluminum tray with three compartments: one compartment for frozen turkey slices and the other two for side dishes. The Swanson Company's first frozen dinner was a turkey dinner; eventually, the company added chicken and beef entrées. With over half of American households owning televisions by the 1950s, the Swanson brothers called their frozen meals "TV dinners," suitable for eating on a folding tray in one's living room while watching television.

=== TV dinner brand ===
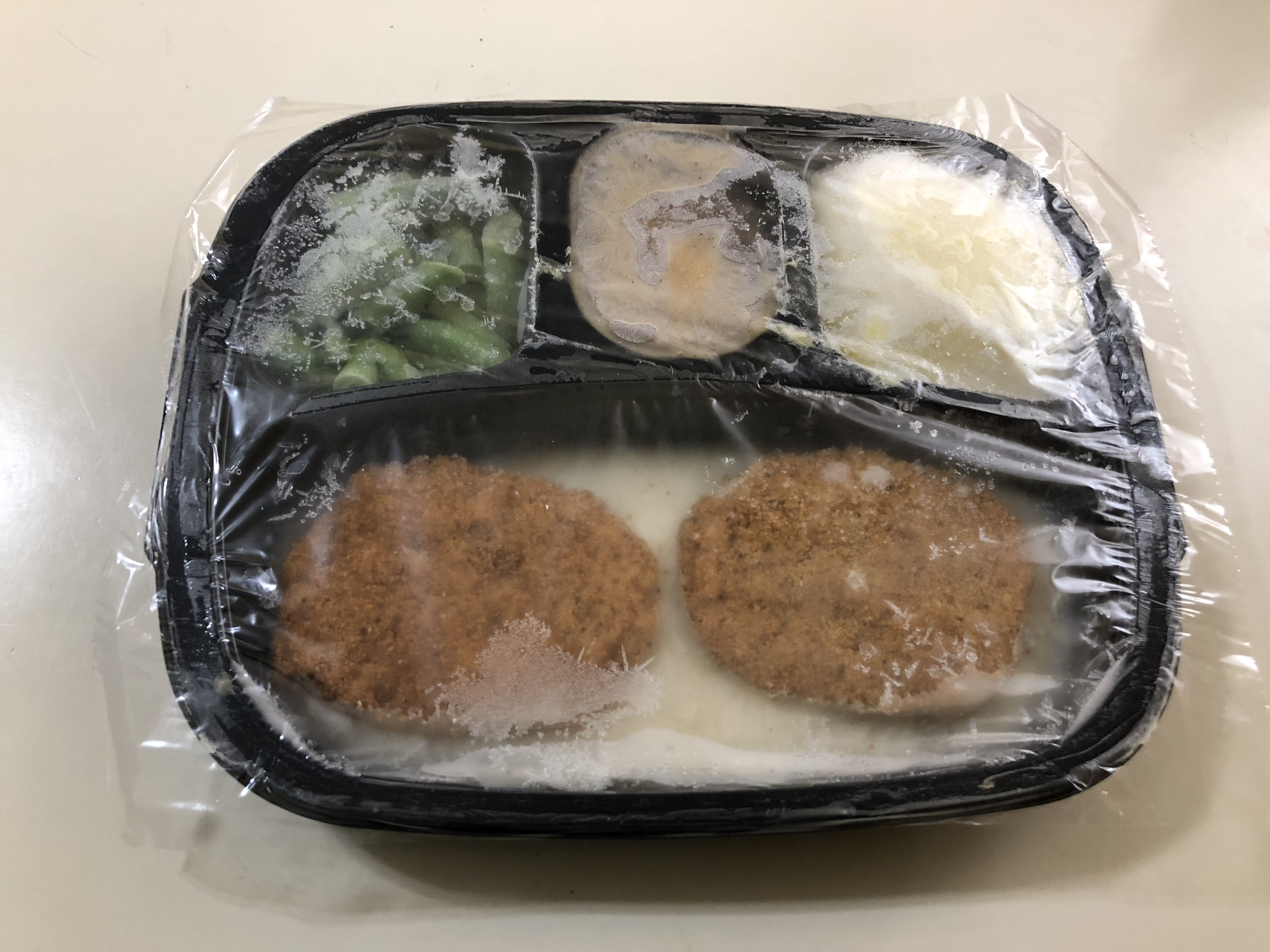
A Swanson "Hungry-Man Country Fried Chicken" TV dinner

The Swanson & Sons' TV dinner branded frozen meal sold 5,000 units when it was introduced in 1953; just one year later, the company had sold over 10,000,000 TV dinners. The company discontinued its successful butter and margarine business to concentrate on a poultry-based line of canned and frozen products. In April 1955, Swanson's 4,000 employees and 20 plants were acquired by the Campbell Soup Company for a large block of Campbell's stock to the Swanson brothers. By 1956, the Swanson brothers were selling 13 million TV dinners annually.

For the majority of its run, Swanson sponsored the game show, The Name's the Same, with Robert Q. Lewis, alternating sponsorship with the Bendix Home Appliance division of Avco, and then Johnson's Wax. In a few 1980s and 1990s commercials for the TV dinner, the announcer was Mason Adams.

=== 1970s to present ===
When Swanson's TV dinners launched in the 1950s, the product competed primarily with home-cooked food, and was developed with a relatively low price for the consumer. By the 1970s, the increasing number of two-income families and single working parents shifted competition to restaurant food, either eaten at the restaurant or ordered to take home. During this period, American consumers were increasingly exposed to a greater variety of international cuisines and more sophisticated flavors, and the consumer was also growing more nutrition-conscious and discerning. Competing in this new environment required more expensive ingredients, but Swanson was slow to change its traditional menus, and slow to recognize the increasing importance of the microwave oven in the heat-and-eat food market. It continued to use non-microwaveable foil trays long after competitors had adopted microwaveable paper and plastic trays. Swanson eventually introduced a new line of frozen dinners called "Le Menu" in 1983 which featured more sophisticated menus on undivided plastic microwavable plates with lids. But by then, the company was competing with many other strong brands, such as Armour and Stouffer's. Stouffer's had also begun targeting the diet market with its reduced-calorie Lean Cuisine frozen meal line. Swanson trailed behind these developments.

In March 1998, Campbell Soup spun-off the Swanson frozen meal business along with several other brands, including Vlasic, to a company called Vlasic Foods International; In 2001, Vlasic Foods International filed for Chapter 11 bankruptcy protection, and the company was re-branded Pinnacle Foods in 2001. In the spin-off, Campbell Soup granted Pinnacle a ten-year license to use the Swanson name on frozen meals and pot pies. That agreement expired in mid-2009, just before Pinnacle purchased Birds Eye Foods. Pinnacle continued to produce frozen meals, but it discontinued the use of the Swanson name in favor of the Hungry-Man brand; however, it remained in use for pot pies. Swanson's frozen breakfast line was re-branded Aunt Jemima several years before. On June 27, 2018, Conagra Brands announced the acquisition of Pinnacle Foods for $8.1 billion. The acquisition closed on October 26, 2018.

== International operations ==
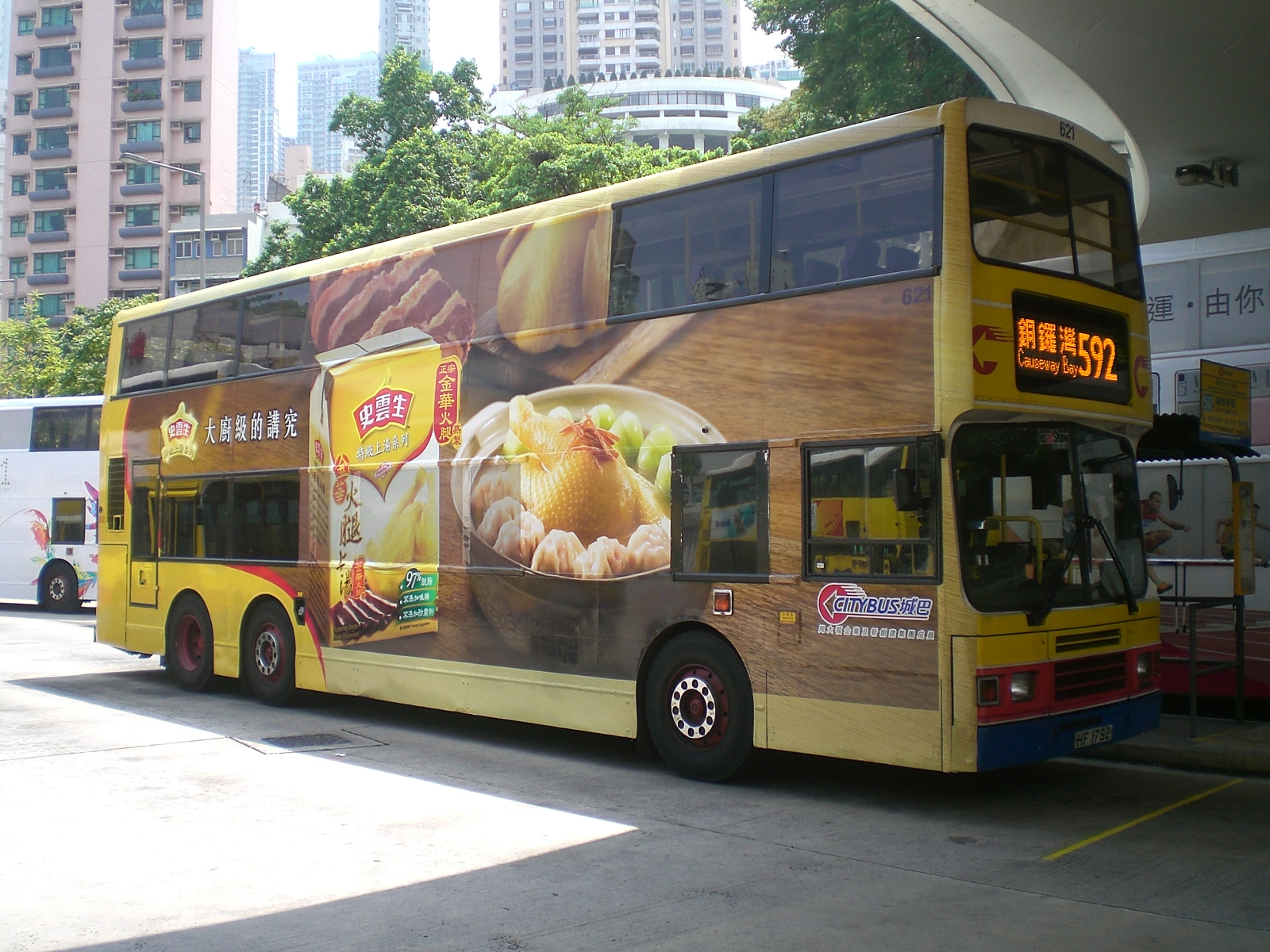
A bus advertising Swanson broth in Hong Kong in 2008

Adolf Ho Ping-yau, managing director for the Campbell Soup Company in Hong Kong, introduced the Swanson brand to Hong Kong in 1987. Ho introduced Swanson chicken broth to the Hong Kong market following a visit to a Campbell's factory in the United States, in which he saw excess chicken soup created during the production of TV dinners going to waste due to a lack of demand for chicken broth in the US. As of 2004, Swanson chicken broth is Campbell's best-selling product in Hong Kong, and the Swanson line of soup products have a market share of 90% in Hong Kong.

== Tributes ==
A branch of the Omaha Public Library is named for W. Clarke Swanson.

== See also ==
- Mrs. Wagner's Pies

== Bibliography ==
- McKee, Jim (October 16, 2004). "Too much turkey led Swanson to invent TV Dinner". Lincoln Journal Star.
- "Who "invented" the TV dinner?". Library of Congress.
