= Shopbop =

American online fashion retailer

- Website type: Subsidiary of Amazon.com
- Available in: English, Russian, Chinese
- Headquarters: Madison, Wisconsin, U.S.
- Owner: Amazon.com
- Founders: Bob Lamey; Martha Graettinger; Ray Zemon
- CEO: Kim Fleissner (CEO)
- Industry: E-commerce
- Products: Clothing, shoes, handbags and accessories
- Employees: 400 (2015)
- Website: www.shopbop.com
- Commercial: Yes
- Launched: November 1999
- Current status: Active

Shopbop is a US online fashion apparel and accessories shop opened in 1999. It has been a subsidiary of Amazon.com since 2006.

== History ==
Shopbop was founded by Bob Lamey, Martha Graettinger, and venture investor Ray Zemon in November 1999 in Madison, Wisconsin. It was originally the internet presence of brick and mortar clothing dealer Bop in downtown Madison (the shop was closed in 2014). Graettinger and Lamey chose Madison because it was a college town with strong fashion-conscious student base.

Shopbop was acquired by Amazon.com in February 2006. At the time of the deal it was selling 103 different lines of high-end clothing. Since the acquisition Shopbop ran almost completely independently from Amazon, which also sells clothes and accessories, and even competed with it. In September 2013 Shopbop opened the East Dane contemporary menswear website, that merged with Shopbop.com in 2021.

The website went through several redesigns, particularly in 2012 and 2017 (among the redesigns, a loyalty program was added to the website).

In 2022, Shopbop launched a new beauty category.

== Products ==
Shopbop offers a wide selection of clothing, shoes, bags, and accessories for women. The company's product offerings range from high-end designer pieces to more affordable, trendy items. Shopbop's selection includes dresses, tops, pants, jeans, skirts, outerwear, swimwear, lingerie, and more.

In addition to women's fashion, Shopbop also offers a selection of men's clothing and accessories. The men's collection includes clothing, shoes, and accessories from brands such as Calvin Klein, Levi's, and Tommy Hilfiger.
