= Andrew Rosen (retail executive) =

American retail executive

- Occupation: Fashion executive
- Spouses: Adrian Mottola (m. 1984; div. 1995) Jenny Dyer (m. 2014)
- Children: 2

Andrew Rosen is an American retail executive and a third-generation garment industry entrepreneur. He co-founded Theory, Inc. in 1997, served as its CEO until 2019, and later executive chairman of Rag & Bone. He has been an investor in a number of fashion companies, including Alice + Olivia, Rag & Bone, Skims, Veronica Beard, and TWP.

== Early life ==
Rosen was born to Carl and Shirley Rosen. He attended prep school in New Jersey, and high school in Carmel, California. He attended the University of Miami for one year before dropping out.

== Career ==
Rosen's first job was at 19 in a knitting mill on Long Island, operating punch cards. His grandfather Arthur Rosen, a Russian immigrant and a skilled garment cutter, founded the Puritan Dress Company in 1910 in Waltham, Massachusetts. Arthur's son Carl took over the business in the 1950s, relocated it to New York City's department store district, and changed the name to the Puritan Fashions Corporation. In 1977, Carl Rosen produced the first designer jeans, with a license from Calvin Klein. By Carl Rosen's death in 1983, the company's sales totaled nearly $300 million.

At 26, Rosen took over as president and CEO of Puritan after his father's death, but oversaw flagging profits. Calvin Klein and Barry Schwartz acquired the company after a year, inviting Rosen to stay on as an executive, and four years later named him company president. Rosen then worked as CEO of Anne Klein for six years. According to the New Yorker, he was fired from Anne Klein "because of disagreements over the brand's strategy".

In 1997, Rosen partnered with the designer Elie Tahari to found Theory. Rosen and Tahari's most important style innovation was the introduction of technically sophisticated stretch fabrics to a modern business silhouette. The Wall Street Journal wrote that "Rosen bet that he could build a business on unfussy, well-made pants and shirts with no auteur behind them, and he won big." By 2003, the company had annual sales of over $200 million, and Rosen and Tahari sold the label to its Japanese licensee, Link Holdings. Rosen kept an 11 percent stake in the business, which he sold once its holding company brought Theory public in 2005. Rosen was Theory's CEO from 1997 until he stepped down in 2019.

In 2024, Rosen was named executive chairman at fashion label Rag & Bone, which is owned by Guess. Rosen has been involved with Rag & Bone as an investor since 2006. He is also an investor in the fashion brand TWP.

== Support for New York City garment manufacturing ==
Rosen has been a supporter of the Fashion Manufacturing Initiative of the New York City Economic Development Corporation, which aims to strengthen the garment sector in New York City by offering grants, training, and resource-sharing to clothing companies.

== Personal life ==
Rosen is married to Jenny Dyer. He has two children with his first wife, Adrian (née Mottola), who he married in 1984. They were divorced in 1995.

Rosen is a lifelong horse racing aficionado and owns more than fifty racehorses. His stallion Chief's Crown was a 1984 Breeders' Cup winner.
