= J2 Communications =

Defunct American production company

- Type: Media
- Founded: March 1986; 40 years ago
- Founder: James P. Jimirro
- Defunct: 2002
- Fate: Acquired by Dan Laikin and Paul Skjodt
- Successor: National Lampoon, Inc.
- Headquarters: Los Angeles, California, US
- Divisions: National Lampoon magazine (1990–1998)

J2 Communications was a media production and distribution company that operated from 1986 to 2002. The company is best known for its unsteady stewardship of National Lampoon magazine and all its related properties through the 1990s.

== History ==
=== Media production/distribution ===
The company was founded in 1986 by James P. Jimirro, who had previously been the founding president of the Disney Channel and then a CBS executive. At one point in the late 1980s, J2 Communications distributed ITC Entertainment titles on VHS; it also distributed Dorf, a comedy series starring Tim Conway.

According to a 1999 filing with the U.S. Securities and Exchange Commission,

The Company was originally formed primarily to engage in the acquisition, development and production of entertainment feature film and special-interest videocassette programs, and the marketing of these programs in the home video rental and sell-through markets. Due to increasing competition in the videocassette market, resulting in declining profitability, the Company de-emphasized this segment of its business....

=== National Lampoon ===
In 1990, J2 Communications bought National Lampoon magazine and all its related properties (including the science fiction and fantasy comics magazine Heavy Metal) from then-owners Daniel Grodnik and Tim Matheson, who had acquired the properties in a hostile takeover in 1989. As part of the deal, Grodnik and Matheson agreed to stay on to run the new division.

In May 1992, Kevin Eastman, co-creator of the Teenage Mutant Ninja Turtles, bought Heavy Metal magazine from J2 Communications, becoming its new publisher.

==== National Lampoon brand licensing ====
J2 Communications almost immediately licensed out the "National Lampoon" brand to other companies who wished to make films and similar projects. For instance, J2 Communications was paid for the use of the brand on such films as National Lampoon's Loaded Weapon 1 (1993), National Lampoon's Senior Trip (1995), National Lampoon's Golf Punks (1998), National Lampoon's Van Wilder (2002), National Lampoon's Repli-Kate (2002), National Lampoon's Blackball (2003), and National Lampoon Presents: Jake's Booty Call (2003). (Note: The company was not involved in Vegas Vacation (1997), the fourth installment in National Lampoon's Vacation film series. Vegas Vacation was the first theatrical Vacation film not to carry the National Lampoon label or a screenwriting credit from John Hughes. Also, it is the only National Lampoon film to be released in the 1990s, and the final film released before National Lampoon magazine folded.) Although this enterprise salvaged the company from bankruptcy, some believe it damaged the reputation of National Lampoon as a source of respected comedy.

==== National Lampoon magazine ====
J2 Communications was contractually obliged to publish at least one new issue of National Lampoon magazine per year in order to retain the rights to the "National Lampoon" name. The company showed very little interest in the magazine itself; throughout the 1990s, the number of issues per year varied unpredictably. In 1991 there was an attempt at monthly publication; nine issues were produced. Only two issues were released in 1992. This was followed by one issue in 1993, five in 1994, and three in 1995. After that the magazine was published only once a year for three years; the final issue of the magazine being published in November 1998.

Following the magazine's demise, the contract was renegotiated, and J2 Communications was then prohibited from publishing future issues. J2, however, still owned the rights to the brand name "National Lampoon", which it continued to franchise out to other users.

=== Acquisition ===
In 2002, J2 Communications was sold to Dan Laikin and Paul Skjodt, and renamed "National Lampoon, Inc." James P. Jimirro stayed on as National Lampoon, Inc. CEO until January 2005.
