= Landmark for Peace Memorial =

Memorial sculpture in Indianapolis, Indiana, US

- Artists: Greg Perry and Daniel Edwards
- Year: 1994
- Type: bronze and Cor-Ten steel
- Location: Martin Luther King Jr. Park 1702 N. Broadway St. Indianapolis, Indiana, United States; 39°47′27″N 86°08′47″W
- Owner: Indianapolis Parks and Recreation Department

The Landmark for Peace is a memorial sculpture in Dr. Martin Luther King Jr. Park on the northside of Indianapolis. It honors the contributions of the slain leaders Robert F. Kennedy and Martin Luther King Jr. The memorial, which features Kennedy and King reaching out to each other, was designed and executed by Indiana artist Greg Perry. The bronze portraits were created by Indianapolis sculptor Daniel Edwards.

On April 4, 2018, the memorial was designated as the Kennedy-King National Commemorative Site.

== Background ==
On April 4, 1968, Robert Kennedy flew to Indianapolis for a planned, inner-city rally promoting his presidential campaign, and was informed upon landing about King's assassination. Kennedy was told that riots had broken out in other cities and was advised not to make the speech, but he proceeded to address the gathered crowd at 17th and Broadway, near the site where the memorial now stands. Instead of a campaign stump speech, he delivered a five-minute improvised statement informing the crowd of King's death and urging racial reconciliation. No riots took place in Indianapolis, a fact many attribute to the effect of Kennedy's speech.

== History ==
The idea to create the Landmark for Peace was originally suggested by Indiana Democratic politician, Larry Allyn Conrad. Before his death Conrad befriended Steve Mannheimer, an Indianapolis Star art critic and Herron School of Art professor. They once spoke at length about the need to commemorate the events of April 4, 1968, and Robert Kennedy's speech to a crowd gathered near the corner of 17th and Broadway streets in Indianapolis. At the time Conrad was an executive with the Simon Property Group, the Indianapolis-based shopping mall developers, and a close friend of Herbert A. Simon and his wife Diane, who had been a worker in Kennedy's campaign at the time of his speech. Conrad suggested that should a memorial be created, the Simon family would offer its support.

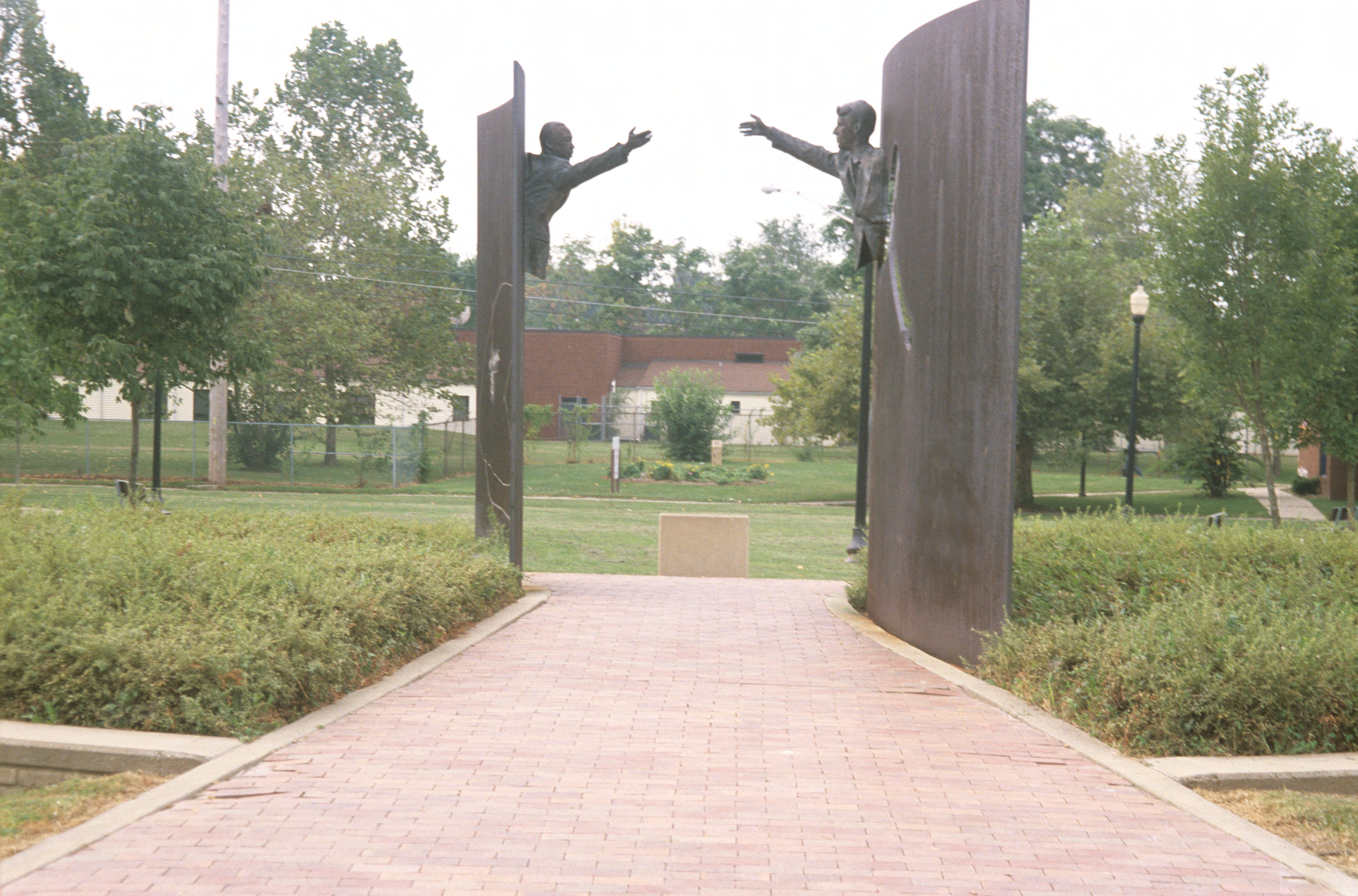

In 1994 Donnie Walsh, president and CEO of the Indiana Pacers, owned by the Simon brothers, decided to start the Pacers Foundation to empower young people and support community partnerships addressing equity in safety, education, and health. Walsh discussed his plans with Mannheimer, who recounted to Walsh the earlier conversation with Conrad. Walsh immediately seized on the idea of a memorial as an ideal project to launch the Foundation and asked Mannheimer to work with Pacers executive Kathryn Jordan on the project. Together Mannheimer and Jordan developed a plan to hold a national design competition to create a memorial to Martin Luther King Jr. and Robert F. Kennedy. The design competition was funded by the Pacers Foundation.

Jurors for the competition included Bret Waller, director of the Indianapolis Museum of Art, and Harry Robinson, professor of architecture at Howard University. From a national field of over 50 entries, the jury selected the proposal by designer Greg Perry, a 33-year-old artist from Franklin, Indiana. Perry's design featured two half-figures—one of King, the other of Kennedy—emerging from solid walls flanking a pathway to reach toward each other. It was an inspired design that captured the historical importance of these two great Americans and powerfully expressed the spirit of reconciliation and the striving for peace people still found in the story of their lives—and deaths. Before the actual construction of the memorial began, a ceremonial groundbreaking was held on May 14, 1994. This event attracted President Bill Clinton, Senator Ted Kennedy, RFK's widow Ethel Kennedy, two sons of King, Dexter Scott King and Martin Luther King III, as well as other Indiana and national dignitaries.

As the memorial construction got underway, the jury suggested modifications to make Perry's original design more open and inviting. These included shortening and some physical piercing of the walls to allow greater visual penetration of the entire structure. Perry worked with Mannheimer and Daniel Edwards, who sculpted and oversaw casting of the figures of King and Kennedy, to fine-tune the design. To relieve the monolithic solidity of the steel walls, the three conceived the idea of openings contoured to suggest shadows cast by the half-figures. After several attempts to shine bright lights on the half-figures to create actual shadows, Mannheimer drew the desired contours in chalk on the steel walls, which were laser cut and smoothed to create the cut-outs. The total cost of creating and installing the memorial, including two markers with bronze plaques, approached $200,000. One of the plaques contains the text of Kennedy's speech, parts of which were later inscribed on his own memorial at Arlington National Cemetery after the senator's assassination later that year. A marker near the actual spot from which Kennedy spoke contains remnants of guns confiscated by the Indianapolis police or collected as part of a city amnesty program created in conjunction with the Indiana Pacers. The contest required the confiscated weapons to be used in the memorial's design.

The City of Indianapolis contributed significantly to the project by completely redesigning the southern half of King Memorial Park where the sculpture would stand. This effort amounted to a $350,000 addition to the total project and was overseen by the Indianapolis Parks and Recreation Department and its landscape architecture staff. The unveiling of the Landmark for Peace memorial on September 30, 1995, attracted nearly 3,000 people.

On April 4, 2018, exactly fifty years after King's assassination and Kennedy's speech, President Donald Trump signed into law the Kennedy-King National Commemorative Site Act designating the Landmark for Peace Memorial as the Kennedy-King National Commemorative Site.

== Expansion ==
In April 2009, a $3 million expansion was planned for the memorial. Components of this expansion would include an eternal flame incorporated into the site, an amphitheater to seat 75 to 200 people, and twin elliptical walkways along a wall that abruptly end to symbolize the sudden end of the lives of King and Kennedy.

== See also ==
- Civil rights movement in popular culture
- List of memorials to Martin Luther King Jr.
