= Eli Simon =

American businessman

- Born: 1987 or 1988 (age 38–39)
- Education: Wharton School at the University of Pennsylvania (BSc, MBA)
- Occupation: Businessman
- Title: CEO, Simon Property Group
- Term: 2026-
- Predecessor: David Simon
- Parent: David E. Simon
- Relatives: Melvin Simon (grandfather); Paul Skjodt (great uncle)

Eli M. Simon (born 1987 or 1988) is an American businessman, and the chief executive officer (CEO) of Simon Property Group, an S&P 100 company founded by his grandfather and great uncle, and the largest U.S. publicly traded commercial real estate company.

== Early life ==
He is one of five children of billionaire David E. Simon (1961–2026), and his wife Jacqueline.

Eli Simon graduated from Park Tudor School in 2006, and earned both a bachelor's degree in economics and an MBA, both from the Wharton School at the University of Pennsylvania.

== Career ==
Before joining the family business, he was a principal and head of North American lodging at Sculptor Capital Management (formerly Och-Ziff), where he managed asset and portfolio acquisitions.

He was chief operating officer of Simon Property and was named CEO the day after his father died.
