= The Romp (website) =

Entertainment website

- Industry: Comedy website, softcore pornography
- Founded: April 2000
- Defunct: 2005
- Headquarters: Los Angeles, California, U.S.
- Key people: Eric Eisner, Bruce Forman
- Number of employees: 35 (spring/summer of 2000); 14 (fall of 2000); 11 (summer of 2001)
- Website: Romp.com archive

The Romp (also known as Romp.com) was a Los Angeles-based entertainment website that specialized in original flash animation videos and games. It began operations in April 2000 and closed in 2005. The website was founded by Bruce Forman and Eric Eisner, son of then Disney CEO Michael Eisner. The site was known for its raunchy, politically incorrect content, and its target demographic (described by Eisner as "people who watch South Park, listen to Howard Stern and read Maxim) were males aged 16 to 25.

== History ==
Eric Eisner and Bruce Forman met at UCLA's Anderson School of Management, where they both earned their MBA degrees in June of 1999. They got the idea for a site targeting young men during their final months at UCLA. Eisner and Forman were 26 and 28 respectively when they put up the initial seed money for Romp.com in 2000 and followed that by drawing in $15 million from private investors. The site attracted nearly 200,000 users during its first six weeks. The company had 35 employees at one point, though it downsized to 14 in the fall of 2000. By March of 2001, Romp.com had 600,000 registered users. Romp.com started a subscription service called "The Romp Mafia" in March 2001, attracting 11,000 subscribers in its first three weeks.

== Content ==
Romp.com was primarily known for its flash animation video series. The site also featured message boards (called "spew boards"), chat rooms, and softcore images of women. Some of Romp.com's web series included:

- Booty Call - a choose your own adventure game, co-created by Julian Max Metter and Cate McManus, in which users played as ladies' man Jake (voiced by Metter) and guided him in his quest to get laid. Booty Call was Romp.com's flagship show.
- Tardz - a series about mentally-challenged white collar professionals
- The Adventures of Bill and Ted - an animated series following the adventures of Bill Clinton and Ted Kennedy
- Sex and the Inner City - a parody of the then-new HBO series Sex and the City
- Coach Bigot - an animated series about a stereotypically bigoted redneck little league coach
- Officer Krupt - an interactive series about a corrupt police officer

== Expansion to film, television, and magazines ==
Romp.com quickly began to expand from the web to a full-fledged entertainment company. In the fall of 2000, Romp.com signed a development deal with Mandalay Sports Entertainment to produce reality game shows. Two projects developed by the company included Peephole, which involved people on the street being offered money to do outrageous things while contestants bet on how far the people on the street will go to get the money, and The Hunt, which followed contestants on a cross-country scavenger hunt, but neither made it to the air.

Romp.com signed a deal with H&S Media to create a mini-magazine of repurposed content to accompany H&S's Maxim-esque men's magazine The Edge. Romp.com was in final talks with H&S to create a standalone Romp magazine, but that never came to fruition when H&S went bankrupt in fall of 2001.

After downsizing four employees and cutting the site's staff to 11, Forman announced plans for Romp.com to shift its focus from original web programming to traditional media in May 2001, concluding "it is mission impossible to make money off the Internet with original programming."

Romp.com's production company offshoot, Romp Studios, independently produced Jake's Booty Call, a feature-length version of the site's popular series Booty Call, in 2003. The film, which was co-written and co-directed by Eric Eisner and Booty Call co-creator/star Julian Max Metter, was acquired by National Lampoon for distribution.
