= National Lampoon, Inc. =

American brand assets company

- Type: Joint venture
- Industry: Publication and media
- Genre: Humor, satire
- Predecessor: J2 Communications
- Founded: August 2, 2002 in West Hollywood, California, U.S.
- Founder: Dan Laikin and Paul Skjodt
- Headquarters: Los Angeles, California, United States
- Owner: The National Lampoon Company
- Website: www.nationallampoon.com

National Lampoon, Inc. is a company formed in 2002 in order to use the brand name "National Lampoon" in comedy and entertainment following the tradition of its magazine predecessor, The National Lampoon. In the words of its prospectus, the role of the company was to "develop, produce, provide creative services and distribute National Lampoon branded comedic content through a broad range of media platforms."

Since 2002, the company has overhauled its corporate infrastructure several times, with former CEOs Dan Laikin and Tim Durham being convicted of financial crimes related to the company.

== History ==
=== Laikin era ===
In 2002, Dan Laikin and Paul Skjodt bought J2 Communications, license holder of the National Lampoon brand, and renamed the company National Lampoon, Inc. Laikin's relationship with J2 Communication CEO James P. Jimirro was contentious. During this period, the surprise success of National Lampoon's Van Wilder (2002) validated Laikin's belief in the brand's potential. However, ongoing conflicts drained resources and demoralized staff. Eventually, Laikin and Jimirro reached a compromise to share control, but the dual leadership structure was confusing and demoralizing for employees. Jimirro stayed on as National Lampoon, Inc. CEO until January 2005.

Laikin initially viewed his investment in National Lampoon as short-term but became more hands-on. He attempted to recapture the spirit of the original magazine from its 1970s heyday. According to a 2017 Vanity Fair article:

Laikin retained Matty Simmons, National Lampoon’s founding publisher, to develop projects from the archives and reach out to alumni from the golden age. Laikin got Chris Miller, who’d written the original stories that became Animal House, to serve on a creative advisory board, and also got in touch with Tony Hendra, who’d edited the magazine for a few years and produced Lemmings.

Laikin focused on expanding the brand, acquiring Burly Bear Network in September 2002 and renaming it the "National Lampoon College Network". He initiated original programming, including a reality show starring Bridget "the Midget" Powerz. The company rebranded, secured deals, and explored various media projects. Laikin's inclusive hiring practices supported young talent, though the company faced financial losses, with Laikin and investor Tim Durham covering costs. Despite growth, the company struggled to become profitable, losing millions annually: "In 2003, the first full year under Laikin’s half-control, the company lost $5.9 million. In 2004, it lost another $5.1 million. When cash flow was insufficient to cover payroll, Laikin would reach into his own pocket."

During this period, the National Lampoon office was a chaotic mix of beautiful women, D-list celebrities, and quirky characters, resembling scenes from the company’s own films. The workplace included "scanner girls" pretending to archive old issues, frequent celebrity cameos, and recurring roles for the likes of Dennis Haskins and Kato Kaelin. Laikin hired friends and gave opportunities to many, fostering a unique but financially unstable environment. Despite the eccentricity, there was a strong sense of camaraderie among the staff, who admired Laikin's dedication and felt deeply loyal to him, despite the company losing millions annually. Laikin's outsider status, however, made it difficult to attract top talent. Missteps included misjudging the influence of Matty Simmons and struggling with ineffective business strategies. The company’s outdated technology, poor financial decisions, and misaligned projects like National Lampoon Presents Dorm Daze further hindered success. Despite some minor wins, Laikin's reliance on dubious partners and failed branding initiatives led to substantial losses. The company continued to lose millions.

Late in 2005, Laikin moved the National Lampoon offices to Sunset Boulevard, aiming to centralize in Hollywood, but insiders saw it as a rookie move. In 2006, the company launched a comedy radio station, and in 2007 it heavily invested in original content such as movies and stage shows. Despite attempts to stabilize by raising $10 million, the company still relied heavily on licensing and produced subpar films.

Financial troubles mounted, and by 2008, the company faced plummeting stock and threats of de-listing. In the spring and summer of 2008, Lakin desperately engaged in a stock manipulation scheme. In December 2008, federal prosecutors in Philadelphia filed charges against Laikin, with accusations that he and two third-party stock promoters attempted to artificially inflate the company's stock price. Laikin stepped down as CEO, succeeded by top investor Tim Durham.

Laikin pleaded guilty on September 23, 2009, to his role in a conspiracy to manipulate the stock price from March through June 2008. In September 2010, a Philadelphia court sentenced him to 45 months in prison.

=== Durham era ===
Meanwhile, Durham replaced Laikin as CEO, initiating significant changes. He shut down divisions, ceased royalty payments to The Harvard Lampoon, and sued Warner Bros. for owed funds. Durham's leadership saw layoffs, reduced salaries, and delayed payroll. Despite cost-cutting, however, the company reported a $6 million loss in 2009. Durham lived lavishly, renting a mansion and dating a former Penthouse Pet. He engaged Ludacris for projects and pursued Hollywood connections, but his questionable business tactics attracted scrutiny — the next year Durham was involved in a major Ponzi scheme.

Durham's eventual arrest for looting millions led to house arrest but did not at first deter his control of the company. In 2012, however, Durham was sentenced to 50 years in prison.

=== Donnes era ===
In 2012, Alan Donnes, a former stand-up comedian, took over as CEO of National Lampoon, Inc. Released from prison, Laikin returned to the company, although he was restricted from executive roles. He clashed with Donnes, leading to failed attempts to fire each other. Legal battles ensued over funds linked to Durham's Ponzi scheme. Eventually, National Lampoon settled with Laikin and sued Durham for embezzlement. Donnes attempted to revitalize the company, distancing it from past controversies and focusing on podcasts and mainstream deals.

=== PalmStar era ===
In July 2017, PalmStar Media purchased all the assets of National Lampoon, Inc., including the trademark and its library of print, audio, film, and video content.

In 2019, National Lampoon named Evan Shapiro, formerly of NBCUniversal Media Group, as its president, in hopes of resuscitating the brand. He was laid off in 2020, with the company suing Shapiro for fraud, alleging in New York federal court that he owed more than $3 million for surreptitiously funneling the company's intellectual property and money from deals with Quibi, Disney+, and Comedy Central Digital into companies he controlled.

Shapiro later claimed that National Lampoon Co-CEO Kevin Frakes had bullied him out of a job.

== Properties of the company ==
=== National Lampoon Press ===
National Lampoon, Inc. releases humor books and material under the umbrella of National Lampoon Press, with distribution by Holtzbrinck Publishers. These include republished collections of old National Lampoon magazine material, including True Facts, Foto Funnies, cartoons, etc. from the 1970s and 1980s. (From 2002 to 2005, the company rereleased old material under the name National Lampoon Books, which was an imprint of Rugged Land, LLC.)

=== Feature films ===
After its purchase by J2 Communications in 1991, the National Lampoon franchise became predominately a name-licensing company with no creative input, in which the company was paid for use of its brand on titles such as Loaded Weapon 1 (1993), National Lampoon's Senior Trip (1995), National Lampoon's Golf Punks (1998), Van Wilder (2002), Repli-Kate (2002), National Lampoon's Blackball (2003), and National Lampoon Presents: Jake's Booty Call (2003). When the company was purchased from J2 Communications, this practice was eventually discontinued.

Under the new ownership, the company began to purchase independent films and release them under the distinctive title of "National Lampoon Presents". The first releases in this series were National Lampoon Presents The Beach Party at the Threshold of Hell and Electric Apricot: Quest for Festeroo, both released in 2007.

Although these practices salvaged the company from bankruptcy, many believe it damaged the reputation of National Lampoon as a source of respected comedy.

In June 2007, National Lampoon, Inc. announced its intention to finance, produce, and distribute its own feature films. In an interview with the New York Times, National Lampoon, Inc. CEO Dan Laikin stated that, "When I came in, we had to re-energize the brand and cut back on the licensing, because the only way to take control of the brand was to make sure that ultimately we put it on projects that we are proud of." Eventually, the company hoped to release four of its own films annually and acquire up to eight more for distribution. The first release was 2007's National Lampoon's Bag Boy, starring Dennis Farina and Brooke Shields.

=== Stage shows ===
In the fall of 2007, National Lampoon revived the live sketch comedy variety show, National Lampoon's Lemmings for a nationwide theatrical tour. The show consisted of a multimedia presentation of live sketches written and performed by the cast, which are integrated with related comedy videos.

In 2008, National Lampoon's Lemmings went into production with ManiaTV! on a half-hour web-based sketch comedy show. Notable cast members included Adam Devine, Blake Anderson, Kyle Newacheck and Anders Holm of Comedy Central's Workaholics fame, Jillian Bell, and Mark Gagliardi from Comedy Central's Drunk History and The Thrilling Adventure Hour. Both Lemmings and ManiaTV! were later discontinued.

In 2020, the company rebooted Lemmings as "Lemmings: 21st Century", which was scheduled to debut in a two-night engagement at Joe's Pub in Manhattan in March 2020 (right at the outset of the COVID-19 pandemic). Instead of spoofing Woodstock, the new stage play "tackle[d] modern festival culture through Downfall, a parody mash-up of corporatized events like Coachella and Bonnaroo."

=== Podcasts ===
The Final Edition

The Final Edition was a National Lampoon podcast from November 2015 to August 2019. The show was first created by former Lampoon editor Tony Hendra and author Jeff Kreisler, and was later primarily run by Barry Lank. As of the time of its separation from National Lampoon, The Final Edition has been getting 1,000 downloads per episode, putting it in the top 10 percent of podcasts, as measured by estimates from Rob Walch, VP of Podcaster Relations at Libsyn.

National Lampoon Radio Hour - The Podcast

Replacing The Final Edition was the National Lampoon Radio Hour: The Podcast, which debuted in December 2019. It starred Megan Stalter, Brett Davis, Alex English, Aaron Jackson, Rachel Pegram, Lorelei Ramirez, and Martin Urbano.

=== Comedy album ===
Lampoon issued Are There Any Triggers Here Tonight in 2016, using material from its The Final Edition podcast. It was the first Lampoon album in 35 years.

=== NationalLampoon.com and the web ===
The company's website, NationalLampoon.com, has been awarded "Best of the Web" from The Los Angeles Times, Forbes, USA Today, CNN and The Wall Street Journal, and was twice nominated by the Webby Awards for "Best Humor Site" in 2001 and 2005. In 2002, the content of NationalLampoon.com was officially registered into the Smithsonian Institution for best exemplifying American satire in the weeks following the September 11 attacks. The website later emphasized original video content, both in-house and freelance, spread to viral video hosting sites such as YouTube.

In September 2002, Lampoon website writers Steve Brykman, Joe Oesterle, Sean Crespo, and Mason Brown were laid off; the four men decided to "sell themselves" on EBay to the highest bidder.

In addition to the content created by The National Lampoon staff, The National Lampoon Humor Network was an affiliation of almost fifty comedy websites owned or partnered with National Lampoon. Collectively, they drew approximately 5 million monthly viewers in May 2007. This format gave it a consistent Comscore rating of #1 amongst comedy websites, barely beating out Comedy Central's web presence at #2.

During 2011, the website was redesigned to resemble the classic National Lampoon magazine format. Staff writers and contributors included comedians Sandy Danto, Jessica Gottlieb, Phil Haney, Aaron Waltke, Seth Herzog, Evan Kessler, Kevin McCaffrey, Nadine Rajabi, Garrett Hargrove, Travis Tack, Eddie Rawls, and Matt Zaller.

Publishing daily satire and cartoons, as of 2017 National Lampoon online was helmed by Editor-in-Chief Marty Dundics with contributing writers and artists including The New Yorker cartoonist Bob Eckstein, SNL humorist Jack Handey, author Mike Sacks, MAD magazine's Kit Lively, Paul Lander, Jon Daly, Dan Wuori, Brooke Preston, Trump satirist Johnny Wright, and Playboy Playmate/Huffington Post columnist Juliette Fretté.

National Lampoon was very active on Twitter, initiating hashtag games that produce trending topics. According to their social media accounts on Facebook, Twitter, and Instagram they were 'The Comedy Brand.' IHeartRadio was a content partner with National Lampoon Comedy Radio featuring National Lampoon Radio News. The NationalLampoon.com site included a store that sold branded T-shirts and back issues of the original magazine.

=== Radio ===
National Lampoon Comedy Radio
- Type: Comedy radio network
- Country: United States
- First air date: October 1, 2006
- Radio stations: XM 154
- Area: United States
- Owner: Premiere Radio Networks
- Parent: National Lampoon, Inc.
- Dissolved: March 6, 2009

National Lampoon Comedy Radio was a 24/7 all comedy radio network that was made available to XM Satellite Radio, AM, FM, HD, Cable Radio and Podcast. It ran for two and a half years.

Affiliated with Clear Channel Communications, National Lampoon Comedy Radio was first added to XM Satellite Radio, and began airing on the satellite radio service on October 1, 2006. Much of the programming was broadcast from National Lampoon World Headquarters in West Hollywood, California. The station had pre-recorded, mock-live comedy talk shows with hosts Nadine Rajabi "Nadine @ Nite", Kevin Couch, and Phil Iazzetta broadcasting five days a week. The programming was built around stand-up performances from famous comedians such as Jerry Seinfeld, Robin Williams, George Carlin, D. L. Hughley, and Bob Saget. The station also played prank calls from Crank Yankers and other sources, parody songs (labeled "Poon Tunes"), and interviews with active comedians (Marc Maron, Larry The Cable Guy, Dave Attell, and many more).

Behind the scenes, the XM network was created and run out of two small, adjoining offices in a building on Sunset Blvd. The programming, while seeming live to the listener, was pre-recorded and uploaded to an XM server each day.

While on the air, the station was funded by Kent Emmons and supported by a staff of Tre Giles, David Frederic, Eugene Chin, Kevin Couch, Phil Iazzetta, Nadine Rajabi, Eric Cahill, and Jason Sharp.

Funding for the network was pulled in May 2008, when it was deemed unprofitable (despite having not employed anyone to sell ads). The Sirius-XM feed continued to air existing National Lampoon Comedy Radio content until March 2009, when it was replaced by talk programming.

=== Television ===
Originally formed in 2002 from the remnants of the Burly Bear Network, the National Lampoon College Network was a block of weekly television programming broadcast to colleges and universities. The format was similar to MTVu, the college-focused division of MTV.

=== Livestreaming ===
In 2020, National Lampoon launched a twice-weekly comedy livestream, "National Lampoon Live with Harrison Greenbaum," on YouTube and Facebook to help raise money for the COVID Foundation, with the goal of helping healthcare workers and other frontline and essential workers. Starring comedian Harrison Greenbaum, the show featured stand-up comedians and comic actors from across the country in a topical news panel format.

== Other media ==
National Lampoon's Strip Poker
Released on pay-per-view in 2005 after being filmed at the Hedonism II nudist resort in Negril, Jamaica. The one-hour episodes featured various Playboy, WWE, and pin-up models competing in strip poker match-ups.
National Lampoon's Knucklehead Video
A video-sharing and social networking site featuring viral video content of extreme sports bloopers, "drunken debauchery" and the self-explanatory 'show us your butts'.
National Lampoon's Eye for an Eye
A syndicated television program that provided a variation on popular thirty-minute courtroom reality shows.
National Lampoon's Chess Maniac 5 Billion and 1
A video game from the early 1990s for the PC platform. It was a 3-D chess game with animated battle scenes between the pieces when you attacked another piece, in the style of Battle Chess. Computer Gaming World said the game is "[...] an example of marketing strategy taking precedence over product quality." German magazine Aktueller Software Markt gave the game a rating of "very good".
National Lampoon's Blind Date
A dating sim video game from 1994 by Trimark Interactive. Entertainment Weekly called it "quite cleverly written". German magazines PC Joker and Power Play gave the game scores of 29% and 58% respectively.

The GSN cable television network in 2003 produced a comedy game show National Lampoon's Funny Money, hosted by Jimmy Pardo. The game featured guest comedians and the more laughs in the "funny zone" were registered, the more points were earned. The winner went on to play for a National Lampoon vacation.
