= Laikin (surname) =

Laikin is a surname. Notable people with the surname include:

- Dan Laikin (fl. 2002–2012), American business executive
- Paul Laikin (1927–2012), American comedy writer

== See also ==
- Maksim Laykin (born 2003), Russian footballer
