= Eric Eisner (producer) =

American film director

- Born: October 16, 1973 (age 52)
- Occupation: Producer
- Years active: 1994–present
- Spouse: Stacey Bendet (m. 2008)
- Children: 3
- Parent(s): Jane Breckenridge; Michael Eisner
- Family: Breck Eisner (brother); Sigmund Eisner (great-great-grandfather)

Eric Eisner is an American producer and the founder and CEO of Double E Pictures, and partner at The Tornante Company. He is the son of Disney magnate Michael Eisner and a producer.

== Early life and education ==
Eisner is the son of Jane Breckenridge, a business advisor and computer programmer, and Michael Eisner, former head if Disney. His mother is a Unitarian of Scottish and Swedish descent while his father is Jewish.

Eisner holds a Bachelor of Arts degree from Dartmouth College and a Master of Business Administration (MBA) from the UCLA Anderson School of Management.

== Career ==
Eisner started his entertainment career in sports, working for the NHL team, the Anaheim (Mighty) Ducks. There he worked in the hockey operations department and helped renegotiate both the radio and television contracts. Eisner also spent two years as a talent scout and participated in the scout table during those NHL entry drafts.

Eisner founded the popular original content site Romp.com. The site produced original short form animations and live action shows. Eisner wrote and directed the film, Jake's Booty Call, an animated feature-length film based on a short on Romp.com and distributed by National Lampoon.

In 2006, Eisner founded Double E Pictures (formerly L+E Productions). The company’s production of Hamlet 2 won wide acclaim as a late entry to the Sundance Film Festival in Park City, Utah, in January 2008. After the screening, an all-night bidding war took place for rights to distribution, which Focus Features won for a near-record $10 million, acquiring worldwide rights to the film. Hamlet 2 is the first Eisner film to be featured at Sundance. Eisner also created the television show Madden Nation, which aired on the ESPN Networks for four seasons.

Double E Pictures is currently developing a number of film projects about a wide variety of subjects including: The Grateful Dead (on which Eisner is lead producer); reputed organized crime figure Meyer Lansky; and Mossad agent and Israeli hero Eli Cohen.

Eisner is Partner at The Tornante Company, a privately held firm that invests in, acquires and operates companies in media and entertainment. Tornante was founded in 2005, and its portfolio includes: Clique Media Group (now Clique Brands - the brand umbrella for lifestyle sites including Byrdie and Who What Wear); Omaze; Portsmouth football club; TaskRabbit; Topps; Vuguru; and Tornante TV, which produces both original and syndicated television content. Among Tornante TV’s original projects is BoJack Horseman. Eisner was also on the board of Topps, which was acquired by Tornante in 2007.

== Philanthropy ==
Eisner is on the Board of The Eisner Foundation, which was founded in 1996 and contributes to a number of non-profit organizations including SCORE (Spinal Cord Opportunities for Rehabilitation Endowment), which provides grants to people who have had sports-related spinal cord injuries. The foundation has also undertaken several special initiatives, including through partnerships with: The Aspen Institute, to advance arts programming nationwide and increase the role of arts in all aspects of America’s culture; California State University Northridge, to help prepare teachers, parents and clinicians in supporting the educational and emotional needs of all types of learners; Project GRAD (Graduation Really Achieves Dreams), a college outreach program that prepares K-12th grade students in the Northeast San Fernando Valley to enter and succeed in college; and The Eisner Pediatric & Family Medical Center, which offers comprehensive services including prenatal care, medical care for infants, children and adolescents, a women’s health center, adult medical, dental and mental health care, and child development centers at 11 sites across the county.

Additionally, The Eisner Foundation annually awards The Eisner Prize to non-profit programs or individuals that unite multiple generations.

== Personal life ==
In 2008, he married fashion designer Stacey Bendet on the Caribbean island of Anguilla. They have three daughters born in 2008, 2011, and 2015.

== See also ==
- Michael Eisner
- The Walt Disney Company
- Hamlet 2
