= Tim Durham =

Convicted American lawyer and financier (born 1962)

- Born: Timothy Shawn Durham Sr. 1962 (age 63–64); Seymour, Indiana, US
- Occupations: Attorney (disbarred), investor
- Spouse: Joan SerVaas Durham
- Children: Timothy Durham Jr.
- Status: Inmate #60452-112; incarcerated at FCI Greenville; Greenville, IL; earliest possible release February 1, 2056
- Conviction: June 20, 2012
- Criminal charges: Wire fraud, securities fraud, conspiracy to defraud
- Penalty: 50 years in prison, two years' supervised release (overturned September 4, 2014; reinstated June 26, 2015)

Timothy Shawn Durham Sr. (born 1962) is an American former lawyer and businessman convicted in 2012 of the largest corporate fraud ever investigated by the Federal Bureau of Investigation in Indiana. His investment firm Obsidian Enterprises invested in a number of companies, including wireless device company BrightPoint and comedy brand National Lampoon, Inc., where Durham was CEO. In 2012, Durham was sentenced to 50 years in prison in connection with a Ponzi scheme that defrauded 5,400 investors, many of them elderly, of approximately $216 million, according to the U.S. Securities and Exchange Commission. For his crimes, Bloomberg News nicknamed Durham the "Madoff of the Midwest."

== Early life and education ==
Durham grew up in Seymour, Indiana and attended Seymour High School. He graduated from Indiana University Bloomington and its law school Indiana University Robert H. McKinney School of Law in 1987.

== Career ==
=== Businesses and Obsidian ===
He worked for law firm Ice Miller after graduation, and in 1989 he married Joan SerVaas. Durham soon joined the investment firm owned by his wife's father, Indianapolis financier and longtime city council president Beurt SerVaas. Durham left the firm after his 1998 divorce. Durham was involved in taking over numerous ailing companies, including school bus manufacturer Carpenter, cargo trailer makers Danzer Industries and United Expressline, U.S. Rubber Reclaiming, and bus leasing firm Pyramid Coach.

In 2001, he took his company Obsidian public. The public company then invested in a range of companies, including a rally-car builder, a plastic surgery center, a car magazine, a tour bus operator, a limousine rental company, a nightclub, an Italian restaurant, and a cell-phone billing processor. Obsidian also invested in mobile device distributor BrightPoint and National Lampoon, Incorporated. From 2001 to 2006, Obsidian had cumulative losses of $30 million, according to the bankruptcy trustee. During that time Obsidian was borrowing heavily from Fair Finance Company, an Akron, Ohio-based creditor. Durham and accomplice James Cochran had acquired Fair Finance through a holding company in 2002. Durham appointed Dan Laikin as CEO of National Lampoon Inc. The SEC alleged Laikin conspired to inflate the company's stock price to $5 in order to prevent the company from being delisted from the American Stock Exchange. Laikin alerted authorities to Durham's financial schemes in hopes of getting a reduced sentence. Durham took over as Lampoon CEO after Laikin stepped down.

=== Raid and arrest ===
The offices of Obsidian and Fair Finance were raided by federal agents in 2009, suspected of involvement in a Ponzi scheme. Durham was arrested in 2011.

On June 20, 2012; an Indianapolis jury convicted Durham of 10 counts of wire fraud, one count of securities fraud, and one count of conspiracy to defraud. On November 30, 2012; he was sentenced to 50 years in prison–at his age, effectively a life sentence. While he faced a maximum of 225 years under sentencing guidelines, federal district judge Jane Magnus-Stinson said there was no point in handing down a sentence that long. Nonetheless, Joe Hogsett, the U.S. Attorney for the Southern District of Indiana, called it the longest sentence ever imposed for a white-collar offense in Indiana history.

On September 4, 2014, a federal appeals court overturned two of 10 wire fraud counts against Durham and ordered a new sentencing hearing, saying prosecutors failed to enter some key evidence into the trial record. On June 26, 2015, Durham had his 50-year sentence reinstated. Magnus-Stinson said that "the huge number of victims and the amount of devastation" left little reason to reduce the original sentence. He is serving his sentence at FCI Greenville in Greenville, IL. He was also sentenced to two years' supervised release, but this was largely academic given the likelihood that he will die in prison. His earliest possible release will be February 1, 2056, when he will be 94 years old.

Fair Finance Co. trustee Brian Bash alleged in a lawsuit filed in 2012 that Durham's mother, Mitza Durham, received more than $831,000 in "fraudulent transfers" from her son between 2006 and 2009 that needed to be repaid to the company estate. In 2014, Mitza Durham agreed to repay Fair Finance Co. $500,000, plus interest.

In 2016, Durham was disbarred by the Indiana Supreme Court.

== Political activism ==
According to Businessweek, Durham was a prominent Republican fundraiser. He was on the steering committee for Mitch Daniels' successful gubernatorial bid in 2004 and headed the Indiana fundraising effort for Rudy Giuliani's 2008 presidential campaign.

== Documentary ==
Durham's exploits are featured in the 2015 episode "Playboy of Indiana", of the television series American Greed.
