= Alice + Olivia =

Contemporary clothing company

Alice + Olivia is a New York City based contemporary clothing company with designer Stacey Bendet at the helm. The global brand launched at Barneys in 2002, and is now sold in over fifty countries.

== History ==
alice + olivia is partially owned by University of Pennsylvania alumna Stacey Bendet. Bendet and her founding partner, Rebecca Matchett (later co-founder of Rebecca & Drew Manufacturing), showed their first designs to a crowd of fashion-industry insiders and celebrities in 2002 at the Russian Tea Room, a "just pants" collection introducing the label's signature low-rise, slim-fitting pants in bright colors and funky patterns. Stacey and her founding partner's desire to make "a trouser sexy" or "the focus of an outfit" led them to launch a 20-item collection at the Russian Tea Room in 2002. alice + olivia pants gained immediate popularity due in part to their mindful design. The pants are all cut slim at the hip to create the illusion of elongated legs and a lean silhouette. The brand has since grown to a full lifestyle brand collection including ready-to-wear, gowns, shoes, tech accessories and handbags. In Spring 2017, alice + olivia introduced their first line of eyewear. The line was created in collaboration with eponym, a New York eyewear company.

== Locations ==
The alice + olivia boutiques are designed by Bendet herself.

The brand has 35 US freestanding boutiques in New York, California, Chicago, Connecticut, Georgetown, Atlanta, Dallas and Houston It can also be found at over 800 select department and specialty stores worldwide, including Saks Fifth Avenue, Neiman Marcus, Bergdorf Goodman, Lane Crawford, Isetan, Hankyu, Harvey Nichols, Harrods, and Galeries Lafayette, as well as prominent web retailers including Net-a- Porter and Shopbop.

The brand also has 13 international free-standing stores. In partnership with The ImagineX Group at the prestigious IFC Mall in Central, Hong Kong, Gateway in Harbour City, Breeze Center and Taipei 101 in Taipei, Ion Orchard in Singapore, Shanghai Grand Gateway and Shanghai IFC in Shanghai, and Galaxy Macau in China In partnership with Look Inc. in Japan in Tokyo’s Omotesando district. In partnership with The Chalhoub Group in the Mall of Emirates and The Dubai Mall in Dubai, Laguna Mall in Qatar and in partnership with The Al Ostoura Group in the Avenues Mall in Kuwait.
