= Working Together =

Book about business by Michael Eisner

Working Together: Why Great Partnerships Succeed
- Authors: Michael Eisner, Aaron Cohen
- Language: English
- Publisher: Harper Business
- Publication date: September 14, 2010
- Publication place: United States
- Media type: Print
- Pages: 304
- ISBN: 978-0061732362

Working Together: Why Great Partnerships Succeed is a nonfiction book by American business executive and author Michael Eisner. It documents the former Walt Disney Company CEO's partnerships throughout his own career, plus others throughout modern history such as Warren Buffett and Charlie Munger, Bill Gates and Melinda Gates, and Brian Grazer and Ron Howard.
