= Jake's Booty Call =

- Directed by: Eric Eisner & J. Chad Hammes
- Written by: Eric Eisner
- Based on: Booty Call interactive game series on Romp.com
- Starring: Julian Max Metter
- Distributed by: National Lampoon, Inc.
- Release date: 2003
- Budget: $50,000

Jake's Booty Call (also known as National Lampoon Presents Jake's Booty Call) is a 2003 American animated adventure sex comedy film written and co-directed by Romp.com founder Eric Eisner.

== Background ==
Booty Call is a series of 33 multiplot Flash animation games created by Julian Max Metter, and originally hosted at Romp.com. In these games the player has to follow the main character, Jake, around and help him on his mission to have sex with various women he sees. Usually, the aim is to get him to have sex with one woman; however, a few episodes require more than one to complete.

== Film ==
Jake's Booty Call is based on the Flash series. The screenplay was written by director Eric Eisner (who co-directed the film with J. Chad Hammes), and voice-acting was provided by Jay Lerner and Julian Max Metter. The film was developed by "Romp Studios", taking the name of the website, and has the curious accolade of being the first film ever to be created entirely in Macromedia Flash utilizing the cutting-edge animation & design techniques pioneered by production designers Jason Raines and Michael Montaine who created a similar design style for Mel Brooks’ Spaceballs: The Animated Series several years later.

The film features Jake befriending Siton Manaba, who is revealed to be a prince looking for love, and trouble ensues as they go traveling together. It is in continuity with the series, and the making of the movie is mentioned at some points through the episodes, although its events never are. At the end of the movie, Jake moves back to his home, so it could feasibly take place at any point in Booty Call's canon, the only indication of its point being the appearance of Calvin.

The film was released independently in 2003; however, it was released in the USA only and through selected media, therefore it never went mainstream. National Lampoon, Inc. picked up the film and took it on tour, showing it mostly at universities around the world. Despite the same themes from the series - drug abuse, alcohol and graphic sexuality (although full-frontal nudity is never seen) - it was rated R by the MPAA, marked as suitable for over 17s.

It was released for DVD in February 2008, five years after its independent release.

=== Reception ===
Adweek described Booty Call as employing Animal House humor and suggested that the 16-to-25-year-old male target demographic got a rise from the sexual references. The episodes were also met with amusement by the producer's father, Disney CEO Michael Eisner, who crafted the website's "detailed and legalese 'Terms of Use'".
