= Herb Simon (businessman) =

American businessman (born 1934)

Herbert Simon
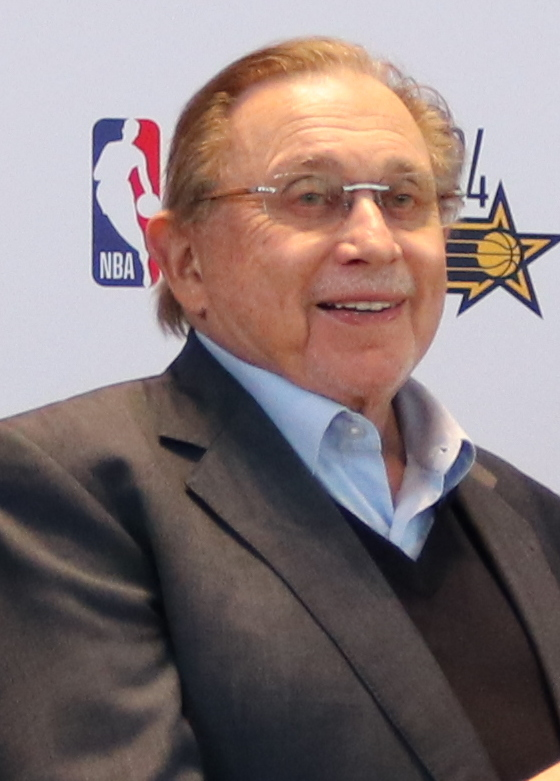
- Simon in 2023
- Born: October 23, 1934 (age 92); New York City, U.S.
- Education: City College of New York (BBA)
- Occupation: Chairman emeritus of the Simon Property Group
- Known for: Real Estate Development; Indiana Pacers, Indiana Fever and Reno Aces owner
- Spouse(s): Sheila Simon (divorced) Diane Meyer (m. 1981; div. 2000) Porntip Bui Nakhirunkanok (m. 2002)
- Children: 8
- Relatives: Melvin Simon (brother); David Simon (nephew)

Herbert Simon (born October 23, 1934) is an American real estate developer. He resides in Indianapolis, Indiana. He was educated at the City College of New York and is the owner of the Indiana Pacers, Indiana Fever, and chairman emeritus of the shopping mall developer Simon Property Group. In 2010, he purchased Kirkus Reviews.

As of October 7, 2026, Forbes has estimated his net worth to be around $7.6 billion.

== Early life and education ==
He was born to a Jewish family in Williamsburg, Brooklyn and grew up in the Bronx, the son of Max and Mae Simon. His father was a tailor who had emigrated from Central Europe. His older brother is the late Fred Simon, who was the longtime leasing director at Simon Property Group. His oldest brother is the late Melvin Simon. Herbert Simon graduated from the City College of New York with a B.B.A. in Business.

== Personal life ==
Simon has been married three times. His first wife was Sheila Simon. They have two children.

In 1981, Simon married Diane Meyer, political staffer for Senator Birch Bayh of Indiana. They divorced in 2000. They have three children.

In 2002, Simon married Porntip Bui Nakhirunkanok (born February 7, 1969, Bangkok, Thailand), Miss Universe 1988. They have three children.

== Indiana Pacers ==
In 1983, Simon and his brother Mel (1927–2009) purchased the NBA's Indiana Pacers from Sam Nassi and Frank Mariani, who were planning to either sell to outside interests or return the team to the league. He is also the owner of the WNBA's Indiana Fever, a role he formerly jointly shared with his nephew David (Mel's son), until David's death in March 2026. and formerly owned the USL's now defunct Reno 1868 FC.

On April 6, 2024, the Naismith Memorial Basketball Hall of Fame announced that Simon would be inducted into the Hall later that year as a contributor.

Sporting positions
Preceded by Sam Nassi; Frank Mariani	Indiana Pacers principal owner 1983–present	Incumbent
New creation	Indiana Fever principal owner 2000–present	Incumbent
