= Rebecca & Drew Manufacturing =

US women's clothing company

Rebecca & Drew Manufacturing was a women's clothing company known for its patented TrioFit sizing system which used a women's "bra size, height, and body shape" to create a nearly custom fit. The sizes ranged from a 32A-38DD bra size and were originally available in regular and long lengths.

The company was co-founded in 2004 by Rebecca Matchett (co-founder of Alice + Olivia) and Drew Paluba. The first retail store opened in Manhattan's Meat Packing District in 2005 and in September 2008 a second boutique location was opened in Houston, TX. The company expanded into e-commerce in 2006. Rebecca & Drew clothing was also sold by luxury retailers, including Neiman Marcus and Saks Fifth Avenue, until the company decided to focus mainly on retail and online sales. February 5, 2008 company was granted a patent for the TrioFit Technology utilized in sizing its garments. The patent “relates to an outer garment...such as a shirt or a shirt-dress, that has optimally adjusted measurements, and includes at least one measurement that changes based on physical characteristics of a wearer, such as bra measurement and height...a different bra cup size and/or height may be defined by adjusting fewer than all measurements, based, for example, on an algorithm.”

In 2009 Rebecca & Drew Manufacturing was recognized as Best Women’s Office Wear in New York Magazine but by 2012 the brand was struggling. In 2013 Rebecca & Drew was re-branded as TrioFit and sold through InStyle magazine. The business partnership ended after one year. In 2014 the company's founder was sued by former business partner Jessica Stark, who had been brought on board to revitalise the company, alleging non-payment for her re-branding services. In 2015 the founder counter-sued with claims of character defamation by Stark.
