= Global Green USA =

US non-profit organization

- Founded: 1993
- Founder: Diane Meyer Simon, and Mikhail S. Gorbachev
- Headquarters: Santa Monica, United States
- Revenue: 45,186 United States dollar (2023)
- Total assets: 5,087,726 United States dollar (2021)
- Website: www.globalgreen.org

Global Green USA is the English-American affiliate of Green Cross International, an international non-governmental organization founded by former Soviet leader Mikhail Gorbachev in 1993 to "foster a global value shift toward a sustainable and secure future." The United States formally joined GCI in the spring of 1994, establishing Global Green USA.

Global Green USA is on a 10 year mission to "lead a global response to keep us within planetary boundaries" and to "bring forth a sustainable global society founded on respect for nature, universal human rights, economic justice, and a culture of peace".

William Bridge serves both as Chairman of Green Cross International and CEO of Global Green USA.

== Past Work ==
In 2007, Starbucks and Global Green collaborated to launch Planet Green Game, an online game where "players can explore a virtual world and learn how everyday decisions by individuals, cities, schools and businesses can impact the climate and environment."

=== New Orleans ===
In 2006, the year after Hurricane Katrina hit New Orleans, Global Green launched a project in the Holy Cross Neighborhood of the Lower Ninth Ward in collaboration with the Home Depot Foundation and actor Brad Pitt. The goal of the project was to build a community climate center, an 18-unit apartment building, and five environmentally-friendly homes to be sold to displaced former residents of the Lower Ninth Ward.

The five homes were successfully built by 2011, but the homes were not sold until 2012, when Global Green modified the homeownership criteria to allow for buyers not from the Lower Ninth Ward. The community climate center, ultimately named the Community Development and Climate Action Center, officially opened in October 2018. However, the apartment complex plans were blocked in 2013, when the Louisiana Housing Corporation denied funding to the project, citing its high cost.

The Katrina National Memorial Foundation Museum moved into Global Green's Community Development and Climate Action Center in 2022 after Hurricane Ida destroyed its original location. However, in 2024, Global Green put the building up for sale, offering to sell it to the museum for $650,000. The museum attempted to raise the needed money to purchase the building but fell short of its goal, eventually relocating to the New Orleans African American Museum.

== Make It Right Settlement ==
In August 2022, Global Green USA agreed to advance US$20.5 million to the Make It Right Foundation and to oversee the distribution of the funds following the settlement of a class-action lawsuit against the latter foundation. The Make It Right Foundation was founded by Hollywood actor Brad Pitt and others following Hurricane Katrina to rebuild homes in the Lower Ninth Ward of New Orleans, Louisiana. Those houses had problems with construction, and the residents sued the Make It Right Foundation and Brad Pitt. Global Green's CEO William Bridge was quoted by The Times-Picayune newspaper as saying that Global Green "had a great relationship with Make It Right and Brad Pitt" and that his organization's board of directors' goal was "to plug it (the money) back into the community."

Terms of the settlement dictated that Global Green provide the entirety of the funds within 10 days. However, in November 2022, Global Green CEO William Bridge wrote in a memo to the court that the organization never had the money to pay the settlement and was instead planning on fundraising the $20.5 million. Previously, Bridge had claimed to have "funders who have committed" to providing support, including Wells Fargo, who later stated that they hadn't had any communication with Global Green that year.

According to court records, Global Green had also committed to using its Community Development and Climate Action Center to manage residents' claims. However, Global Green's former senior project manager for New Orleans claimed that as of April 2022, the building's water and light bills weren't being paid, and it had unpaid property taxes, leading to skepticism that this plan was viable.

Following Global Green's failure to provide the $20.5 million settlement by the 10-day deadline, the judge overseeing the lawsuit ordered the organization to secure $10 million in two months, with reports on its funding efforts required every 30 days. However, on March 23, 2023, the judge allowed the litigation between Lower Ninth Ward residents and the Make It Right Foundation to continue, indicating he no longer believed in Global Green's ability to pay the settlement.

Bridge stated in mid-April 2023 that there was an anonymous philanthropist who would provide a surety bond for the amount of the settlement, promising that he would announce the surety bond was in place by the end of that month. However, in August 2023, Global Green instead announced a new fundraising goal of $5 million—lower than the original settlement amount of $20.5 million—with $382,000 already raised and a GoFundMe campaign launched to raise the remaining amount. As of September 2024, the GoFundMe campaign had only received $1,035.
