= Diane Meyer Simon =

American environmentalist

- Born: 1946 (age 79–80)
- Education: B.A. Butler University
- Known for: founder of Global Green USA
- Spouse(s): N. Stuart Grauel (divorced) Herbert Simon (m. 1981; div. 2000)
- Children: 3

Diane Meyer Simon (born Diane Irene Meyer) (born 1946) is an environmental and political activist, and the founder and leader of Global Green USA and a member of the Green Cross International's (GCI) Honorary Board. She is the former wife of Indiana real-estate billionaire Herbert Simon.

She is from Nappanee, Indiana.

== Early life and education ==
Meyer was an only child, born in 1946 to a French father and a Swiss-French mother. Her father worked as a teacher, a United States Air Force pilot, and medical doctor. Her mother worked as a teacher and a nurse.

Simon earned a B.A. in psychology at Butler University in 1968.

She has worked as an administrator and political staffer for liberal Democratic Senator Birch Bayh of Indiana.

Simon also became Indianapolis's Woman of the Year in 1985.

She moved to California in 1989.

In August 1993, she went to Moscow to attend an international environment conference and met with Mikhail Gorbachev. After this conference, she joined the GCI's Honorary Board and founded Global Green USA as a U.S.-based affiliate of GCI.

== Personal life ==
Meyer has been married twice. Her first husband was N. Stuart Grauel, the then-Deputy Secretary of State of Indiana.

In 1981, Meyer married billionaire shopping mall developer Herbert Simon. They divorced in 2000. They have three children:

- Sarah Elisabeth Meyer Simon is an investor who lives in New York City;
- Rachel Mariam Meyer Simon is an artist and philanthropist living in Indianapolis with her husband Hale Stuart; and
- Asher Benjamin Meyer Simon is an artist in Los Angeles.
