= David Simon (CEO) =

American businessman (1961–2026)

- Born: August 1961
- Died: March 22, 2026 (aged 64)
- Education: Indiana University, Bloomington (BA); Columbia University (MBA)
- Spouse: Jacqueline Freed (m. 1986)
- Children: 5, including Eli Simon
- Father: Melvin Simon
- Relatives: Paul Skjodt (brother-in-law)

David E. Simon (August 1961 – March 22, 2026) was an American billionaire real estate developer, chairman, and chief executive officer (CEO) of Indianapolis-based Simon Property Group, an S&P 100 company and the largest U.S. publicly traded commercial real estate company.

== Early life ==
Simon was born in August, 1961 the son of Jewish American real estate developer and founder Melvin Simon and his first wife Bess (née Meshulam). He was educated at North Central High School and obtained a B.S. degree from Indiana University in 1983 and an M.B.A. from Columbia University's Graduate School of Business in 1985.

== Career ==
Simon started his career at First Boston. From 1988 to 1990, he worked at Wasserstein Perella & Co. as a vice president.

In 1990, he joined Simon Property precursor Melvin Simon & Associates as Chief Financial Officer. In 1993, he led the efforts to take Simon Property Group public with a nearly $1 billion initial public offering that, at the time, was the largest real estate stock offering. He became CEO in 1995 and chairman in 2007. He was a past chairman of the National Association of Real Estate Investment Trusts (NAREIT) leadership team and a onetime trustee of the International Council of Shopping Centers (ICSC). In 2000, he was inducted into the Indiana University Kelley School of Business Academy of Alumni Fellows.

== Philanthropy ==
In 2013, he donated $5 million to support the construction of Columbia Business School's new facilities.

== Personal life and death ==
In 1986, he married Jacqueline Susan Freed. They had five children.

Simon died from pancreatic cancer on March 22, 2026, at the age of 64.
