= Stacey Bendet =

American fashion designer (born 1978)

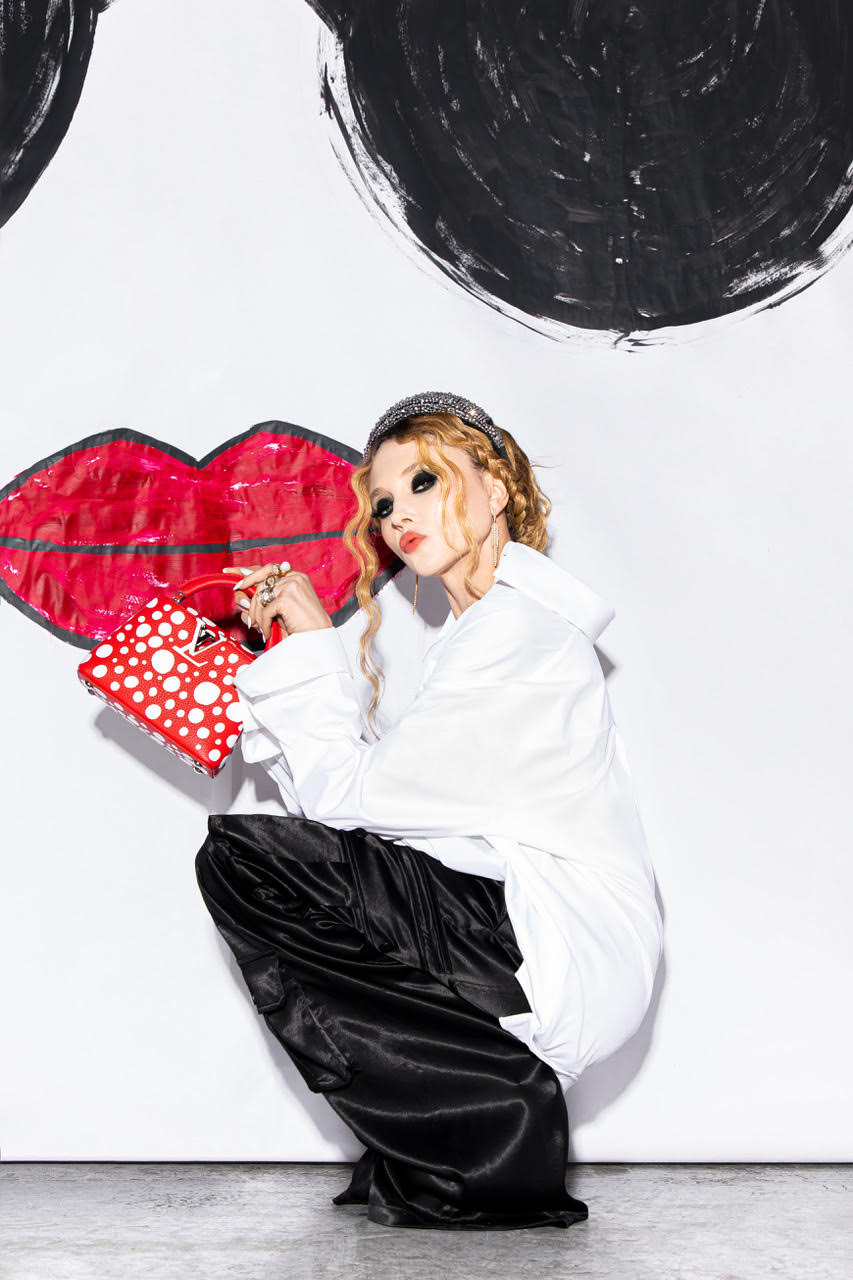
- Bendet in 2023
- Born: Stacey Bendet Weiner; 1978 (age 47–48)
- Education: University of Pennsylvania (BA)
- Occupation: Fashion designer
- Years active: 2002–present
- Spouse: Eric Eisner (m. 2008)
- Children: 3
- Family: Michael Eisner (father-in-law); Breck Eisner (brother-in-law)

Stacey Bendet Eisner is an American fashion designer who is founder and CEO of the clothing company Alice + Olivia.

== Early life and education ==
Bendet was born in 1978 to Olivia (née Bendet) and Joseph Daniel Wiener. Bendet is of Jewish heritage and had a traditional bat mitzvah celebration. Bendet's father ran a textile import business and was "involved in one of the country's leading lace-manufacturing companies", while she herself was interested in fashion and clothing from a young age. Bendet graduated from Horace Greeley High School in Chappaqua, New York, and studied international relations and French at the University of Pennsylvania, graduating in 1999.

== Career ==
=== Alice + Olivia ===
In 2002, Bendet founded Alice + Olivia. Bendet proposed a jeans-style cut slim at the hip to create the illusion of elongated legs and a lean silhouette. Designer Lisa Kline noticed her walking by and ordered 20 sets of pairs, which provided an opportunity for Bendet to launch a collection based around that concept at the Russian Tea Room. Soon after, the department store Barneys New York placed an order, and Andrew Rosen, developer of the Theory fashion line, offered to finance Bendet's new business.

In 2018 the company filed a lawsuit against the Steve Madden-owned Betsey Johnson label for copyright and trademark infringement. It accused Betsey Johnson of using Bendet's signature face, the "StaceFace," on its bags.

=== Other ventures ===
In 2020, she founded and launched Creatively, a networking platform for the creative industry.

Also, in 2020, Bendet co-founded an Instagram campaign called #ShareTheMicNow to bring African-American women's voices to the forefronts of predominately white women's Instagram accounts in an "account takeover" format.

== Personal life ==
She married film producer Eric Eisner, a son of former Walt Disney Company executive Michael Eisner, on the Caribbean island of Anguilla in 2008. The couple have three children: Eloise Breckenridge Eisner, Scarlet Haven Eisner, and Athena Belle Eisner.

Bendet practices ashtanga vinyasa yoga.

Bendet has appeared on the Vanity Fair Best-Dressed list four years in a row and is in the Best-Dressed Hall of Fame.
