= BrightPoint =

American company

BrightPoint, Inc.
- Type: Subsidiary of Ingram Micro
- Industry: Wireless telecommunications
- Founded: 1989
- Headquarters: Indianapolis, Indiana, USA
- Key people: Robert Laikin; J. Mark Howell; R. Bruce Thomlinson
- Revenue: ▲US$5.24B (FY 2010)
- Operating income: ▲US$72.7M (FY 2010)
- Net income: ▲US$48.8M (FY 2010)
- Total assets: ▲US$1.51B (FY 2010)
- Total equity: ▲US$291M (FY 2010)
- Number of employees: 3,909
- Website: www.brightpoint.com

BrightPoint, Inc. was a provider of "wireless device lifecycle services", specializing in the distribution of Wireless devices and in providing customized logistics services to the Wireless industry.

BrightPoint had a 2011 revenue of $5.24 billion. With approximately 4,000 employees as well as a significant number of temporary staff, and activity in more than 35 countries, including 13 Latin American countries through its investment in Intcomex, Inc., BrightPoint handled approximately 112 million Wireless devices globally in 2011.

BrightPoint's services include distribution, channel development, product customization, E-Business, and other outsourced services.

In 2012, BrightPoint was listed at #463 in the annual Fortune 500 rankings. During July 2012 BrightPoint was acquired by Ingram Micro for $650 million. Six of its top executives shared a $30 million payout when the two companies merged, including former CFO, Anthony Boor, who left BrightPoint in 2011.
