= Sigmund Eisner =

American manufacturer (1859–1925)

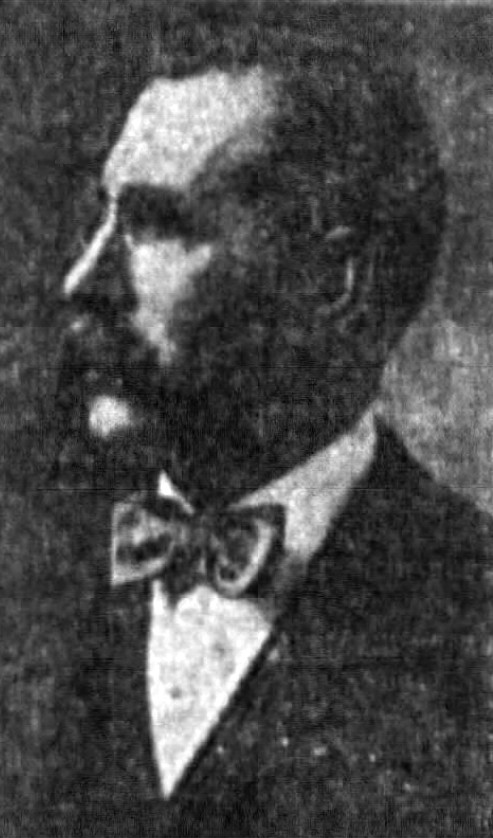
- Born: February 14, 1859; Horažďovice, Bohemia, Austrian Empire
- Died: January 5, 1925 (aged 65)
- Occupation: Manufacturer
- Spouse(s): Bertha Weis (daughter of Elias and Hannah Weis (Red Bank, NJ)
- Children: H. Raymond Eisner; J. Lester Eisner; Monroe Eisner; A. Victor Eisner
- Parent(s): Michael and Catharine (Brumel) Eisner

Sigmund Eisner (February 14, 1859 – January 5, 1925) was an Austrian-American businessman. He was the president of the Sigmund Eisner Company based in Red Bank, New Jersey. At one time (1922), this company was the exclusive manufacturer of uniforms for the Boy Scouts of America and the largest manufacturer of uniforms in the United States. He is also the great-grandfather of Michael Eisner, who was CEO of The Walt Disney Company from 1984 to 2005.

== Early life ==
Sigmund Eisner was born in Bohemia to a Jewish family and was educated in public schools there. At the age of 21, he emigrated to the United States and founded the Sigmund Eisner Company.

== Sigmund Eisner Company ==
The Sigmund Eisner Company started with only a few garments, but specialized in uniforms. With a central factory in Red Bank, New Jersey, branches were established in nearby towns Long Branch, South Amboy, and Freehold. As of 1922, the company had 2,000 employees, but during World War I the company’s roles swelled to 5,000 as the company handled contracts for the United States government as well as several foreign governments.

Eisner's family was also involved in the company. As of 1922, Eisner's sons H. Raymond and A. Victor were first and second vice-presidents, respectively.

== Red Bank ==
Sigmund Eisner (and his family) took great interest in civic and social affairs. Sigmund was governor of the Monmouth Memorial Hospital and the State Home for Boys at Jamesburg, New Jersey. He was vice-president of the Red Cross of Monmouth County and water commissioner of Red Bank. Eisner was a member of the American Jewish Committee, the Jewish Welfare Board of America, and the Zionist Committee of America. His personal interests led him to membership in the Free and Accepted Masons, Ancient Order Nobles of the Mystic Shrine; the Benevolent and Protective Order of Elks; and the Monmouth County Boat Club.

== Family ==
Sigmund married Bertha Weis and they had four sons: H. Raymond, J. Lester, Monroe, and A. Victor.

H. Raymond, the eldest son, was born in Red Bank and attended the local public schools until he went on to attend the Phillips Exeter Academy, from which he graduated in 1906. Following his graduation, he studied at Harvard University and graduated in 1909. Before becoming a vice-president at his father’s company, he attended the Philadelphia Textile School for a one-year course. H. Raymond married Elsie Solomon in Rochester, New York on February 12, 1911.

J. Lester, the second son, was also born in Red Bank, New Jersey. He also took his preparatory course at Phillips Exeter and graduated from Harvard in 1911. J. Lester married Marguerite Davidson on January 13, 1913. Disney CEO Michael Eisner is one of their grandchildren.

Monroe Eisner, the third son, was also born in Red Bank, graduating from Phillips Exeter in 1910 and Harvard in 1914. He subsequently attended Harvard Business School, graduating in 1915. During his studies he was active with the Everett Mills in Everett Massachusetts where he studied fabrics. In 1916 he returned to Red Bank to work at the family factory. Monroe married (in New York City) Winone Jackson on September 11, 1916.

The youngest son, A. Victor (born December 11, 1894) studied at Washington and Jefferson College at Washington, Pennsylvania. At the conclusion of his studies, be entered the family business as second vice-president. A. Victor married Helene Monsky in September 1918.
