= Melvin Simon =

American businessman and film producer (1926–2009)

- Born: October 21, 1926; New York City, U.S.
- Died: September 16, 2009 (aged 82); Indianapolis, Indiana, U.S.
- Other name: Mel Simon
- Education: City College of New York (BA, 1949)
- Occupation: Real estate developer
- Spouses: Bess Meshulam (divorced); Bren Burns
- Children: 5, including David Simon
- Relatives: Herbert Simon (brother); Paul Skjodt (son-in-law)

Melvin Simon (October 21, 1926 – September 16, 2009) was an American businessman and film producer who co-founded the largest shopping mall company in the United States, Simon Property Group, with his younger brother, Herb Simon. The pair jointly purchased the Indiana Pacers in 1983.

== Early life and education ==
Simon was born to a Jewish family in Williamsburg, Brooklyn. He grew up in the Bronx and was the son of Max and Mae Simon. His father was a tailor who emigrated from Central Europe. Simon graduated from the Bronx High School of Science and earned a degree in accounting from the City College of New York in 1949. He served in the US Army, where he was stationed at Fort Benjamin Harrison in Indianapolis in 1953. He supplemented his army pay working as a door-to-door encyclopedia salesman. After leaving the military, he decided to stay in Indianapolis and took a job as a leasing agent when he saw the potential in real estate.

== Career ==
=== Real estate ===
After a few years as a leasing agent and handling leasing at several shopping centers, he formed his own leasing company in 1959 with his younger brother Herb, called Melvin Simon & Associates. Melvin owned 2/3 of the business and Herb the remainder. They started out by developing strip centers anchored by groceries and drugstores; they soon graduated to developing fully enclosed malls. By 1967, they owned and operated more than 3 million square feet of retail property and had expanded nationally. His oldest brother Fred Simon joined the business and became the longtime leasing director at Simon Property Group.

The Simons followed a successful business strategy. They would entice a large anchor tenant, typically a department store, to their planned mall by charging them less rent and then would use the contract to obtain bank financing for the construction, usually with minimal investment from the Simons. Once the project was completed, the Simons would charge smaller stores a higher rate and also required that stores pay a premium over their rent if their sales exceeded pre-negotiated levels.

In 1993, Melvin Simon & Associates went public as the Simon Property Group, raising $1 billion for the Simon brothers. At the time, this was the largest real estate stock offering ever made. In 1996, the company merged with the DeBartolo Realty Corporation in a $3.0 billion merger, becoming the Simon DeBartolo Group. In 1998, the company reverted to the Simon Property Group name and maintained its title as the largest mall operator in the United States, owning 386 properties in North America, Europe, and Asia; clocking 2.8 billion shopper visits each year, and having annual sales in excess of $60 billion. The company, although publicly held, remained controlled by the Simon brothers.

=== Movies ===
In the 1970s, Simon expanded into producing films with Melvin Simon Productions, but ended up losing millions of dollars in what he later called a "big mistake". He produced the 1982 adolescent comedy Porky's.

Movies produced by Melvin Simon Productions:

- The Chicken Chronicles (1977)
- Rabbit Test (1978)
- The Manitou (1978)
- Blood & Guts (1978)
- Matilda (1978)
- Somebody Killed Her Husband (1978)
- The Third Walker (1978)
- Wolf Lake (1978)
- When You Comin' Back, Red Ryder? (1979)
- Dominique (1979)
- Love at First Bite (1979)
- Seven (1979)
- When a Stranger Calls (1979)
- The Runner Stumbles (1979)
- Scavenger Hunt (1979)
- The Man with Bogart's Face (1980)
- Cloud Dancer (1980)
- The Stunt Man (1980)
- My Bodyguard (1980)
- Zorro, The Gay Blade (1981)
- Chu Chu and the Philly Flash (1981)
- Porky's (1981)
- Porky's II: The Next Day (1983)
- Porky's Revenge! (1985)
- UFOria (1985)

=== Indiana Pacers ===
In 1983, the Simons bought the NBA franchise, the Indiana Pacers.

== Personal life ==
Simon was married twice. His first wife was Bess Meshulam. They later divorced (she remarried as Bess Koby and died of cancer in 1977). They had three children: Deborah Simon, Cynthia A. Simon Skjodt (married to professional hockey player Paul Skjodt), and David E. Simon (1961-2026), who became chairman and CEO of Simon Property Group.

In 1972, Simon married Bren Burns and adopted Burns' daughter, Tamme McCauley. They also had a son, Joshua Max, who died in 1999 at the age of 25.

Simon was a member of the Beth-El Zedeck congregation in Indianapolis.

Simon died of cancer on September 16, 2009, at the age of 82. At the time of his death, his wealth was estimated at $1.3 billion.

After his death, a dispute over his most recent will arose between his children from his first marriage and his wife. The will, signed with the physical assistance of a financial advisor, was amended seven months before his death. The revised will provided significantly more for Burns, and significantly less for his children by his first marriage, than previous versions. Burns' eldest children contested that he was suffering from dementia when he signed the new will, which boosted the share of his fortune going to Bren from one-third to one-half.

The judge presiding over the settlement agreed to close the final December 12, 2012, hearing and accept the terms under seal. Although Cynthia Simon-Skjodt declined to comment on the agreement, other than to say she was "glad it's over," upon entering an elevator with Deborah Simon, one of the sisters yelled out a celebratory "YEAH!" after the doors closed.

== Awards and honors ==
- Golden Plate Award of the American Academy of Achievement, 1988
- Jewish Welfare Federation's "Man of the Year"
- The Horatio Alger Award
- Central Indiana Business Hall of Fame
- "Lifetime Trustee" of the Urban Land Institute, 2003
- Trustee of the International Council of Shopping Centers
- Real Estate Legends Hall of Fame housed at the USC School of Urban Planning and Development
- Honorary doctorate degrees from Indiana University Kelley School of Business and Butler University
