= Dan Laikin =

American business executive

Daniel S. Laikin is an American business executive. He was chief operating officer and chief executive officer of National Lampoon, Inc. from 2002 to 2008.

Laikin was co-chairman of Indiana-based real estate development company Biltmore Homes, Inc., until 2000. He also was a managing partner of technology investment firm Four Leaf Partners, LLC.

In 2001, Laikin's group moved to buy a majority stake in J2 Communications Inc., the owner of the moribund National Lampoon properties. From 2002 forward they built media businesses around the brand, becoming active in film, television, radio, and print, as well as building the largest Internet-based comedy network in the world.

Laikin was the largest shareholder of National Lampoon, Inc. In December 2008, the SEC alleged Laikin conspired to inflate the company's stock price. In 2010, a federal judge sentenced Laikin to 45 months in prison. (Laikin was replaced by Tim Durham, who himself was arrested in 2011 for looting more than $200 million from National Lampoon, Inc.) Laikin was released from prison in 2012.
