= Green Cross International =

Environmental organisation

- Type: Nonprofit organization
- Industry: Environmental organisation
- Founded: 1993
- Founder: Mikhail Gorbachev
- Headquarters: Geneva, Switzerland
- Key people: William Bridge, Chairman
- Website: www.gcint.org

Green Cross International is an environmentalist organisation headquartered in Geneva, Switzerland, founded by former Soviet leader Mikhail Gorbachev in 1993. Today, member organisations are in 30 countries. Its primary mission is to "respond to the combined challenges of security, poverty, and environmental degradation to ensure a sustainable and secure future".

William Bridge serves both as Chairman of Green Cross International and CEO of Global Green USA.

== History ==
In October 1987, five years before the first Earth Summit in Rio de Janeiro, Mikhail Gorbachev addressed a gathering in the Arctic city of Murmansk, and for the first time linked the concepts of environmental protection, nuclear disarmament, broader security concerns and development.

On 19 January 1990, in Moscow during an address to the Global Forum on Environment and Development for Survival, Mikhail Gorbachev suggested creating an "international Green Cross that offers its assistance to States in ecological trouble." In other words, the world needed a body that would apply the medical emergency response model of the International Committee of the Red Cross to ecological issues, and expedite solutions to environmental problems that transcend national borders.

On 6 June 1992, six months after leaving office, the Rio Earth Summit civil society delegates appealed to Mikhail Gorbachev to create and launch Green Cross International. At the same time, Swiss National Council parliamentarian Roland Wiederkehr, founded a "World Green Cross" with the same objective. The organizations merged in 1993 to form Green Cross International.

Green Cross International (GCI) was formally launched in Kyoto, Japan, on 18 April 1993. On the invitation of Mikhail Gorbachev, many renowned figures joined and continue to serve on its board of directors and Honorary Board.

The first Green Cross National Organizations (GCNOs) formally joined GCI in The Hague, The Netherlands, in the Spring of 1994. These included Japan, The Netherlands, the Russian Federation, Switzerland, and the United States.

== Mission ==
The initial concept envisaged an international body to provide assistance to countries in ecological trouble.

The organisation's stated mission is to:

- "Respond to the combined challenges of security, poverty, and environmental degradation to ensure a sustainable and secure future";
- "Promote legal, ethical and behavioural norms that ensure basic changes in the values, actions, and attitudes of government, the private sector, and civil society, necessary to develop a sustainable global community";
- "Contribute to the prevention and resolution of conflicts arising from environmental degradation"; and
- "Provide assistance to people affected by the environmental consequences of wars, conflicts and man-made calamities".

== Interaction with other organisations ==
Other organisations are affiliated with GCI in 30 countries.

GCI holds these statuses:

- Consulting body for United Nations Economic and Social Council
- Consulting body for UNESCO
- Admitted observer organisation with the United Nations Framework Convention on Climate Change
- Admitted observer organisation with the Conference of the Parties to the United Nations Convention to Combat Desertification
- Cooperation with the UN Environment Programme/UN Office for the Coordination of Humanitarian Affairs Environmental Emergencies Section
- Cooperation with UN-HABITAT
- Cooperation with other international organisations
