= National Lampoon's Golf Punks =

1998 sports comedy television film by Harvey Frost

- DVD cover
- Written by: Jill Mazursky
- Directed by: F. Harvey Frost
- Starring: Tom Arnold
- Music by: Richard Bronskill
- Country of origin: United States
- Original language: English

Production
- Executive producers: Oscar Gubernati; Lance H. Robbins
- Producer: James Shavick
- Production location: Vancouver
- Cinematography: Patrick Williams
- Editor: Jeremy Presner
- Running time: 92 minutes
- Production company: Shavick Entertainment

Original release
- Network: Fox Family Channel
- Release: September 6, 1998

National Lampoon's Golf Punks is a 1998 American sports comedy television film directed by F. Harvey Frost and written by Jill Mazursky. Tom Arnold stars as an out-of-work golf pro who gets pulled into teaching the game to a group of young golfers at a public course.

The film premiered on Fox Family Channel on September 6, 1998.

== Cast ==
- Tom Arnold as Al Oliver
- James Kirk as Peter
- Rene Tardif as Allister McGrath
- Katelyn Wallace as Christina
- Rhys Huber as Billy
- Neil Denis as Thork
- Tarik Batal as Raghad
- Katrina Pratt as Mai
- Greg Thirloway as Bo
- Cory Fry as Cameron
- Alf Humphreys as Jack (as Alfred E. Humphreys)
- Elizabeth Carol Savenkoff as Nancy
- Jano Frandsen as Trip Davis
- French Tickner as Burt
- Lee Taylor as Harry
- Jerry Wasserman as Joe
- Dave 'Squatch' Ward as Tiny
- Lachlan Murdoch as Bernie
- William MacDonald as Phelps
- Marcus Hondro as Dave McMillan
- Jonathan Palis as Jake
- Tara Lea as Ms. Williamson
- Brendan Beiser as News Reporter

== Production ==
This film and National Lampoon's Men in White were the first films produced as part of The Family Channel's overall rebranding as Fox Family Channel, and the first films announced as part of its deal to produce National Lampoon-related television programs. Filming took place in Vancouver, and wrapped in July 1998.

== Release ==
The film premiered on Fox Family Channel on September 6, 1998.
