= Simon Property Group =

American real estate investment trust

Simon Property Group, Inc.

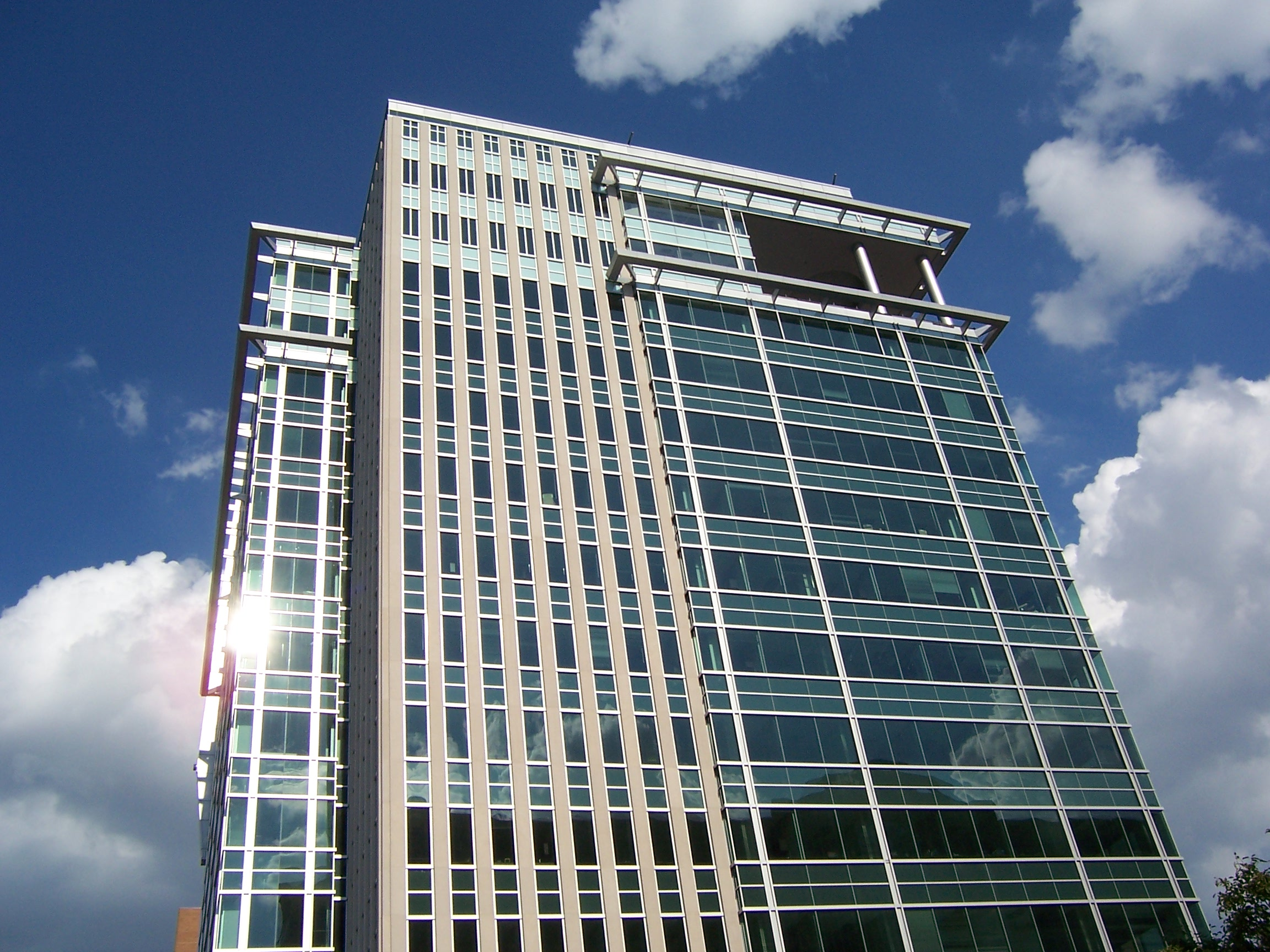
- Headquarters in Indianapolis
- Formerly: Melvin Simon & Associates (1960–1993); Simon DeBartolo Group (1996–1998)
- Type: Public
- Traded as: NYSE: SPG; S&P 500 component
- ISIN: US8288062081; US8288063071; US8288066041; US8288067031; US8288068021; US8288068773; US8288068856
- Industry: Real estate investment trust (REIT)
- Founded: 1960; 66 years ago (as Melvin Simon & Associates); 1993; 33 years ago (as Simon Property Group)
- Founders: Melvin Simon; Herbert Simon
- Headquarters: Indianapolis, Indiana, U.S.
- Areas served: Worldwide
- Key people: Eli Simon (CEO); Larry Glasscock (Chairman)
- Products: Shopping malls; Lifestyle centers
- Brands: See List of Catalyst Brands; Dining Pavilion; Savor Food Hall
- Revenue: ▲US$6.36 billion (2025)
- Net income: ▲US$5.36 billion (2025)
- Total assets: ▲US$40.6 billion (2025)
- Total equity: ▲US$5.21 billion (2025)
- Number of employees: c. 3,600 (2026)
- Divisions: Regional Malls; Premium Outlets; International Properties; The Mills
- Subsidiaries: Genting Simon Group; Mitsubishi Estate Simon Company, Ltd.; Simon Media Properties, LLC; Kravco Simon Investments, L.P.; Klépierre; Taubman Realty Group; Catalyst Brands; Jamestown L.P.
- Website: simon.com

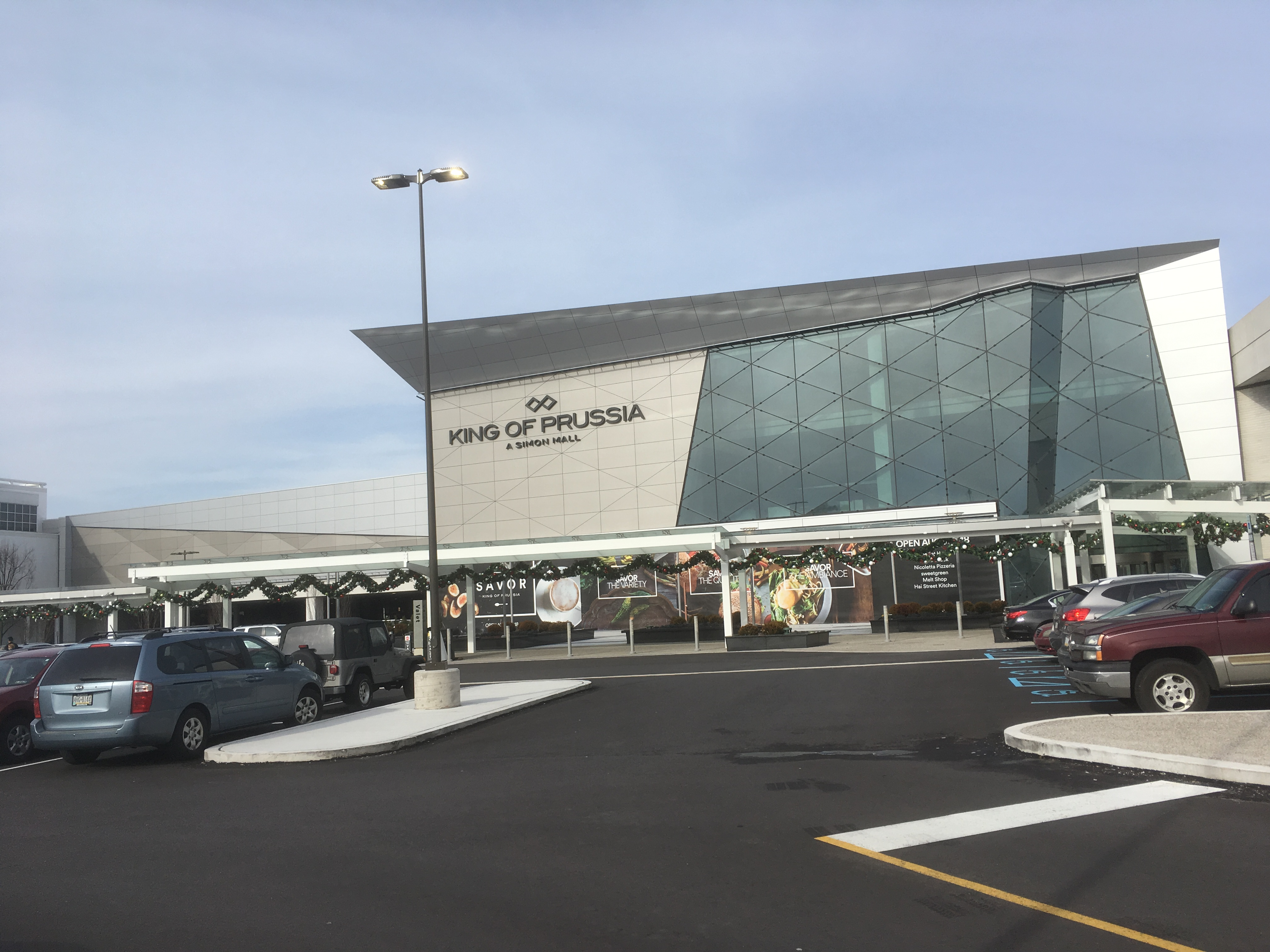
The King of Prussia Mall in Pennsylvania is the fourth largest mall in America.

Simon Property Group, Inc. is an American real estate investment trust that invests in shopping malls, outlet centers, and community/lifestyle centers. It is the largest owner of shopping malls in the United States and is headquartered in Indianapolis, Indiana. As of June 9, 2026, it owned interests in 235 properties.

== History ==
=== 20th century ===
Simon Property Group dates to 1960, when brothers Melvin Simon and Herbert Simon began developing strip malls in Indianapolis, Indiana. In December 1993, they took their interests public as Simon Property Group in the largest initial public offering of a real estate investment trust to date. Simon Property Group merged with the newly public DeBartolo Realty Corporation, owner of the real estate assets of Edward J. DeBartolo Sr., in 1996 to form Simon DeBartolo Group. In the following year, the company acquired The Retail Property Trust for $1.2 billion in a hostile takeover. Also in 1997, in partnership with Macerich, the company acquired 12 malls from IBM's pension plan for $974.5 million. One year after these acquisitions, the company acquired Corporate Property Investors and was reverted to the Simon Property Group name. The company also acquired an ownership interest in Groupe BEG, S.A., operator of shopping centers in Europe.

In 1999, the company acquired 14 shopping centers from New England Development for $725 million.

=== 21st century ===
In 2002, in partnership with Westfield Group and The Rouse Company, the company acquired 13 properties from Rodamco North America including Copley Place, Houston Galleria, and SouthPark Mall. In the following year, Simon acquired a majority interest The Kravco Company, owner of the King of Prussia Mall, for $300 million. The company entered the outlet mall business in June 2004 with the acquisition of Chelsea Property Group, Inc. for $3.5 billion, making their fourth platform Chelsea Premium Outlets (later renamed Simon Premium Outlets, or simply Premium Outlets).

In April 2007, Simon Property Group and Farallon Capital Management acquired the Chevy Chase, Maryland-based Mills Corporation for $1.64 billion. The acquisition led to the creation of Simon's fifth platform, known as The Mills, and ownership and management of Sawgrass Mills in South Florida, the largest outlet mall in the world.

Two years later, Simon attempted to acquire malls owned by General Growth Properties. The Premium Outlets portfolio was expanded with the acquisition of Prime Retail for $2.24 billion in December 2009. In February 2010, Simon placed a bid acquire General Growth Properties, which was in bankruptcy protection. However, the bid was rejected by GGP. A GGP shareholder filed suit (Young v. Bucksbaum) against the company's board of directors for rejecting Simon's bid, alleging breach of fiduciary duty. In April 2010, Simon offered to make a $2.5 billion equity investment in GGP including a $1 billion investment by Paulson & Co. In May 2010, Simon withdrew from the bidding for GGP after GGP favored transactions with Brookfield Asset Management.

In May 2010, Simon acquired Prime Retail's Prime Outlets-Puerto Rico in Barceloneta, Puerto Rico, which it immediately renamed to Puerto Rico Premium Outlets. In August 2010, Simon acquired an additional 21 outlet malls, including locations in Williamsburg, Virginia (Williamsburg Premium Outlets), San Marcos, Texas (San Marcos Premium Outlets) and Hagerstown, Maryland (Prime Outlets-Hagerstown, now Hagerstown Premium Outlets) for a total of $2.3 billion. Several months later, Simon made a $4.5 billion bid for Capital Shopping Centres Group plc in December. However, the offer was rejected and withdrawn in January 2011. In September 2011, Simon acquired Southdale Center in Edina, Minnesota. In March 2012, Simon acquired Farallon's stake in 26 Landmark Mills malls for $1.5 billion. In August 2013, Toronto Premium Outlets opened in Halton Hills, Ontario, Canada. In October 2014, Premium Outlets Montreal, the second in Canada, opened.

In May 2014, the company completed the corporate spin-off of Washington Prime Group, headed by Mark Ordan, the final CEO of The Mills Corporation. In January 2015, Washington Prime Group acquired Glimcher Realty Trust and was renamed WP Glimcher. As part of the deal, Simon acquired The Outlet Collection Jersey Gardens (which it renamed to The Mills at Jersey Gardens to integrate it into its The Mills platform) in Elizabeth, New Jersey and University Park Village in Fort Worth, Texas, while WP Glimcher acquired Brunswick Square in East Brunswick, New Jersey from Simon. Two months later, the company offered $23.3 billion for Macerich; however the offer was rejected and withdrawn in April 2015.

In September 2016, in partnership with Authentic Brands Group and GGP Inc., the company acquired Aéropostale. In October 2016, Simon opened Clarksburg Premium Outlets in Montgomery County, Maryland. It was their first shopping center in the Premium Outlets portfolio to have two floors, as well as the first open-air outlet mall in North America developed from scratch to feature two floors. In May 2018, Premium Outlet Collection YEG opened at Edmonton International Airport. In February 2020, in partnership with Authentic Brands Group, the company acquired Forever 21 in an $81 million deal.

In August 2020, in partnership with Authentic Brands, the company acquired Brooks Brothers and Lucky Brand Jeans. In December 2020, the company acquired Taubman Centers for $3.4 billion. It also acquired JCPenney in partnership with Brookfield Asset Management. In April 2022, Simon and Brookfield offered to buy Kohl's but were rejected. Simon purchased a 50% stake in Jamestown L.P., a real estate developer, in October 2022.

In February 2025, Herb Simon retired as chairman and director. In August 2025, Simon Property named executive vice president, Eli Simon, as their new Chief operating officer.

On March 22, 2026, CEO David Simon died of cancer at age 64. Eli Simon took over as CEO, while still remaining COO and Larry Glassock was named non-executive Chairman.

== See also ==
- Simon Youth Foundation
- List of Simon Property Group properties
