= Michael Eisner =

American businessman and media proprietor (born 1942)

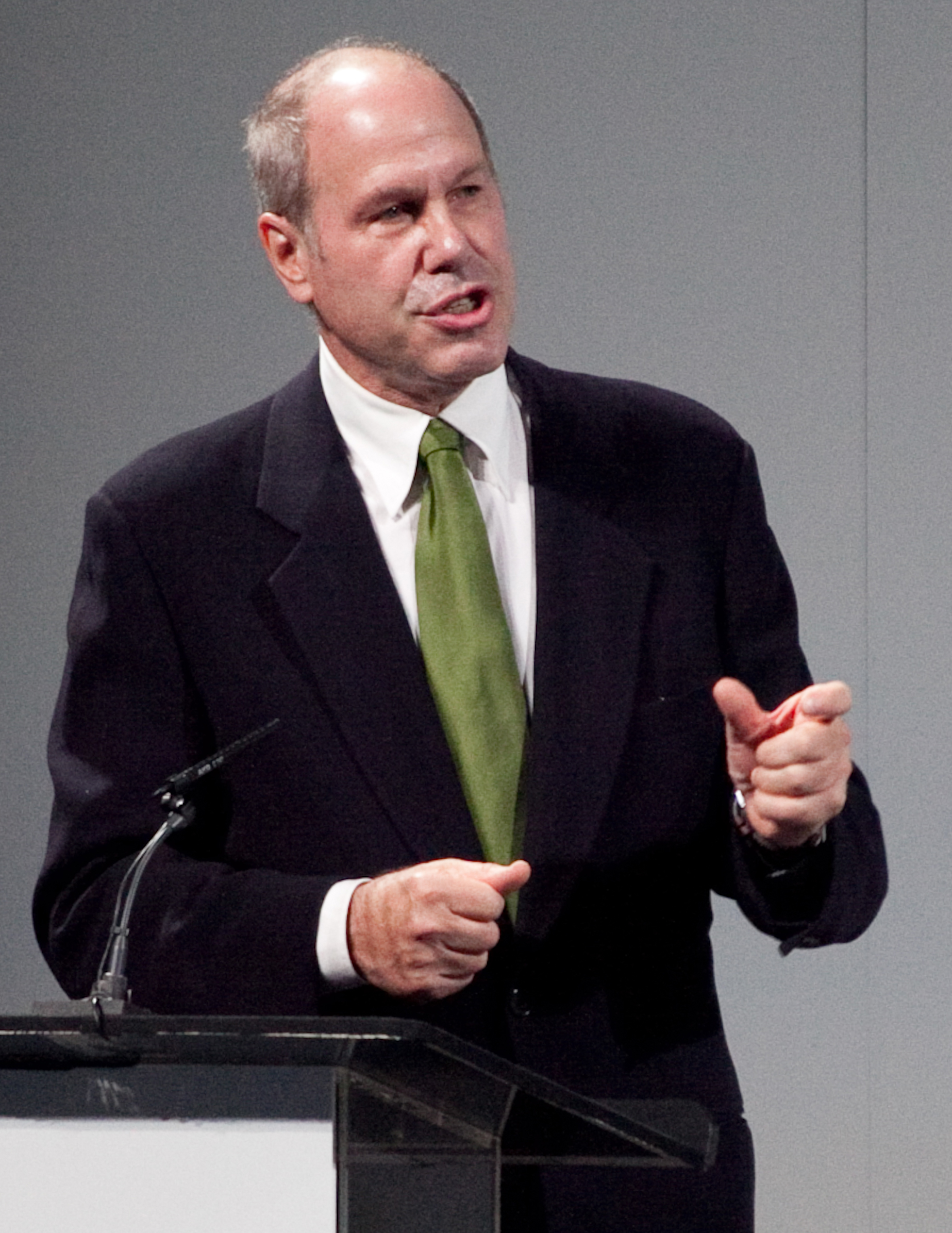
- Eisner in 2010
- Born: Michael Dammann Eisner; March 7, 1942 (age 84); Mount Kisco, New York, U.S.
- Education: Denison University (BA)
- Occupations: Businessman; media proprietor; author
- Years active: 1966–present
- Title: Chairman and CEO of The Walt Disney Company (1984–2005)
- Term: September 22, 1984 – September 30, 2005
- Predecessor: Raymond Watson; Ron W. Miller
- Successor: George J. Mitchell; Bob Iger
- Political party: Democratic
- Board member of: Denison University; The Tornante Company
- Spouse: Jane Breckenridge (m. 1967)
- Children: 3, including Breck and Eric
- Relatives: Sigmund Eisner (great-grandfather); Stacey Bendet (daughter-in-law)
- Website: www.michaeleisner.com

Michael Dammann Eisner (/ˈaɪznər/ EYEZ-nər; born March 7, 1942) is an American businessman and media proprietor who served as chairman and chief executive officer (CEO) of the Walt Disney Company from September 1984 to September 2005. Prior to Disney, Eisner was president of film studio Paramount Pictures from 1976 to 1984, and had brief stints at the major television networks NBC, CBS, and ABC.

Eisner's 21-year stint at Disney saw the revitalization of the company's poorly performing animation studios with successful films such as The Little Mermaid (1989), Beauty and the Beast (1991), Aladdin (1992), and The Lion King (1994), a period known as the Disney Renaissance. Eisner additionally broadened the company's media portfolio by leading the acquisitions of ABC, a majority share of ESPN, and the rights to The Muppets franchise. Eisner also led major investments and expansion of the company's theme parks both domestically and globally, including the openings of Disney-MGM Studios (now Disney's Hollywood Studios) in 1989, Euro Disney (now Disneyland Paris) in 1992, Disney's Animal Kingdom in 1998, Disney's California Adventure Park and Tokyo DisneySea in 2001, Walt Disney Studios Park in 2002 and Hong Kong Disneyland in 2005.

Eisner's final years at Disney were tumultuous: a string of box-office bombs in the early 2000s, public feuds with former associates such as Jeffrey Katzenberg and Steve Jobs, and dissatisfaction with Eisner's management style culminated in the "Save Disney" campaign organized by Roy E. Disney, during which Eisner rapidly lost the confidence of much of Disney's Board of Directors. As a result of the pressure from the campaign, Eisner announced in March 2005 that he would step down as CEO prematurely, handing day-to-day duties to Bob Iger before formally leaving the company in September 2005. He went on to create the stop-motion animated sitcom Glenn Martin, DDS in 2009.

== Early life and education ==
Eisner was born to an affluent, secular Jewish family in Mount Kisco, New York. His mother, Margaret (née Dammann), whose family founded the American Safety Razor Company, was the president of the Irvington Institute, a hospital that treated children with rheumatic fever. His father, Lester Eisner, Jr., was a lawyer and regional administrator of the United States Department of Housing and Urban Development. His great-grandfather, Sigmund Eisner, established a successful clothing company that was one of the first uniform suppliers to the Boy Scouts of America and his great-grandmother, Bertha Weiss, belonged to an immigrant family that established the town of Red Bank, New Jersey. Eisner has one sister, Margot Freedman.

He was raised on Park Avenue in Manhattan. He attended the Allen-Stevenson School kindergarten through ninth grade followed by The Lawrenceville School in 10th through his senior year and graduated from Denison University in 1964 with a bachelor's degree in English. He is a member of the Delta Upsilon fraternity and credits much of his success to his time at Keewaydin Canoe Camp for boys in Vermont.

== Career ==
=== Early work with NBC and CBS, ABC and Paramount ===
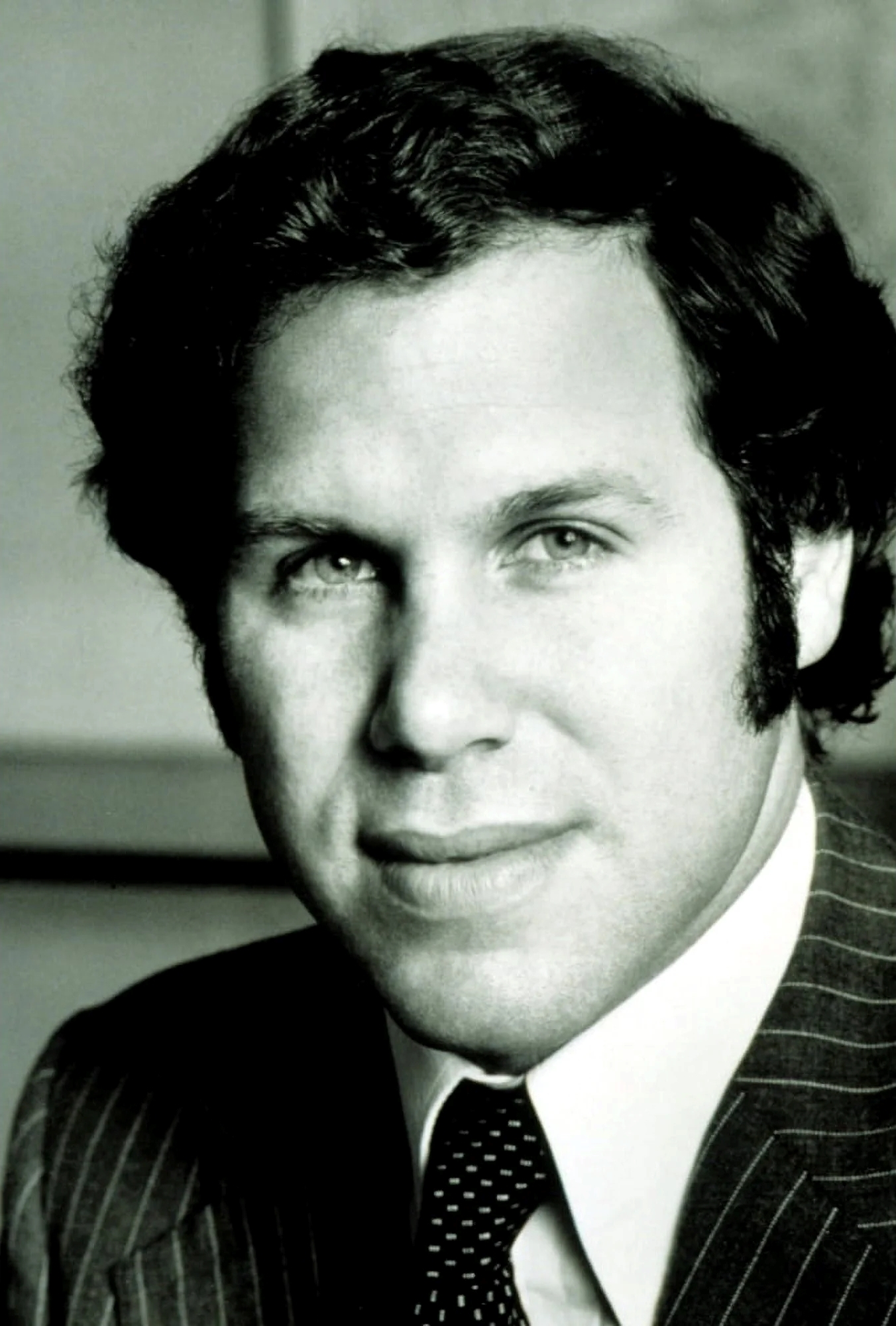
Eisner c. 1977

After two brief stints at NBC and CBS, Barry Diller at ABC hired Eisner as assistant to the national programming director. Eisner moved up the ranks, eventually becoming a senior vice president in charge of programming and development. In 1976, Diller, who had by then moved on to become chairman of Paramount Pictures, recruited Eisner from ABC and made him president and COO of the movie studio. During his tenure at Paramount, the studio produced films such as Saturday Night Fever, Grease, the Star Trek film franchise, Ordinary People, Raiders of the Lost Ark, An Officer and a Gentleman, Flashdance, Footloose, Terms of Endearment and Beverly Hills Cop, and television shows such as Happy Days, Laverne & Shirley, Cheers and Family Ties.

Diller left Paramount on September 30, 1984, and, as his protégé, Eisner expected to assume Diller's position as studio chief. When he was passed over for the job, though, he left to look for work elsewhere and lobbied for the position of CEO of the Walt Disney Company.

=== The Walt Disney Company ===
Following the deaths of founders Walt Disney in 1966, and Roy O. Disney in 1971, the Walt Disney Company narrowly survived several takeover attempts. Its shareholders Sid Bass and Roy E. Disney brought in Eisner (as CEO and chairman of the board) and former Warner Bros. chief Frank Wells (as president) to replace Ron W. Miller in 1984 and strengthen the company. Eisner brought in Jeffrey Katzenberg as Walt Disney Studios chairman.

A couple of years after becoming chairman and CEO, Eisner became the host of The Wonderful World of Disney, making him the public face of the company as well as its top executive. Eisner was not a performer by profession, and studio management did not believe he could do the hosting job. After filming a test video with his wife Jane and a member of his executive team (which required multiple takes) Eisner "came across as stiff and awkward ... Disney executives ... were pretty much unanimous that the test was a failure....Eisner stubbornly persisted in the face of almost unanimous criticism." Eisner hired Michael Kay, a director of political commercials for then-U.S. Senator Bill Bradley, to help him improve his on-camera performance. As a result, Eisner was well-recognized by children at the company's theme parks who often asked him for autographs.

During the second half of the 1980s and early 1990s, Eisner revitalized Disney. Beginning with the films Who Framed Roger Rabbit (1988) which was brought to Disney by Jeffrey Katzenberg and The Little Mermaid (1989) a Ron Clements idea that Eisner originally panned, its flagship animation studio enjoyed a series of commercial and critical successes. Disney also broadened its adult offerings in film when it acquired Miramax Films in 1993. Under Eisner, Disney acquired many other media sources, including ABC, most of ESPN, Fox Family Channel (now known as Freeform), Baby Einstein, and The Muppets franchise. The ABC purchase in particular reunited Eisner with his former employer.

In the early part of the 1990s, Eisner and his partners set out to plan "The Disney Decade" which was to feature new parks around the world, existing park expansions, new films, and new media investments. While some of the proposals were completed, most were not. Those completed included the Euro Disney Resort (now Disneyland Paris) which was vastly over budget, and had low attendance and was acknowledged by Eisner to be his "real financial disappointment", Disney-MGM Studios (now Disney's Hollywood Studios), Disney's California Adventure Park (now Disney California Adventure), Disney-MGM Studios Paris (eventually opened in 2002 as Walt Disney Studios Park), Disney's America, a high-profile failed project to establish a history-themed park in Virginia, and various film projects including a Who Framed Roger Rabbit franchise. However, the lackluster success of Disney's Animal Kingdom in the years after its opening, general stagnation in Disney's revenues and various corporate issues and disputes would dampen Eisner's later career.

In 1993, Katzenberg had lobbied to become Eisner's second in command, which would have meant moving Frank Wells from president to vice chairman, to which Eisner 'replied that Wells would feel "hurt" in that scenario'. Coincidentally, Wells died in a helicopter crash in 1994. When Eisner did not appoint Katzenberg to Wells' now available post, tensions arose between the two that led to Katzenberg's resignation. At the time, Eisner refused to pay Katzenberg his contractual bonus despite Katzenberg's offer to accept $60 million as a settlement, much less than was actually owed. Katzenberg was forced to take the issue to court, who ruled in his favor. The final settlement was $280 million. Katzenberg went on to found DreamWorks SKG, with partners Steven Spielberg and David Geffen. Eisner recalled that "Roy E. Disney, who did not like him at all — I forget the reason, but Jeffrey probably did not treat him the way that Roy would have wanted to be treated — said to me, 'If you make him the president, I will start a proxy fight.'"

Eisner then recruited his friend Michael Ovitz, one of the founders of Creative Artists Agency, to be President with minimal involvement from Disney's board of directors (which at the time included Oscar-winning actor Sidney Poitier, the CEO of Hilton Hotels Corporation Stephen Bollenbach, former U.S. Senator George Mitchell, Yale dean Robert A. M. Stern, and Eisner's predecessors Raymond Watson and Card Walker). Ovitz lasted only 14 months, partly due to outright hostility from Sandy Litvak and Steve Bollenbach and a lack of support by Eisner, and left Disney in December 1996, via a "no fault termination" with a severance package of $38 million in cash, and 3 million stock options worth roughly $100 million, at the time of Ovitz's departure. The Ovitz episode engendered a long-running derivative suit, which finally concluded in June 2006, almost 10 years later. Chancellor William B. Chandler III of the Delaware Court of Chancery, despite describing Eisner's behavior as falling "far short of what shareholders expect and demand from those entrusted with a fiduciary position...", found in favor of Eisner and the rest of the Disney board because they had not violated the duty of care owed by a corporation's officers and board to its shareholders.

==== "Save Disney" campaign and retirement ====
Despite his record of success while serving as President, CEO and Chairman of the Walt Disney Company, Eisner was also known for his habit of integrating much of his Paramount films with Disney. These moves were seen as unfavorable, and led to Eisner’s isolation from other Disney executives by 1995. On November 30, 2003, Roy E. Disney, the son and nephew of co-founders Roy O. Disney and Walt Disney, respectively, resigned from his positions as Disney vice chairman and chairman of Walt Disney Feature Animation. His reasons for resigning was his feeling that there was too much micromanagement within the studio, flops with the ABC television network, the company's growing timidity in the theme park business, the Walt Disney Company turning into a "rapacious, soul-less" company, Eisner's refusal to establish a clear succession plan, as well as the studio releasing a string of box-office movie failures starting in the year 2000, such as The Emperor's New Groove and Treasure Planet, and the company's well-publicized distribution disputes with long-time production partner Pixar Animation Studios and its CEO Steve Jobs, with whom Disney had produced such animated feature film hits as Toy Story, A Bug's Life, Monsters, Inc., and Finding Nemo, which were critically acclaimed and financially successful for both partners.

On March 3, 2004, at Disney's annual shareholders' meeting, a surprising and unprecedented 43% of Disney's shareholders, predominantly rallied by former board members Roy Disney and Stanley Gold, withheld their proxies to re-elect Eisner to the board. This vote followed a stunning rebuke of Eisner and his executive and chairman practices by both the Institutional Shareholder Services and Glass, Lewis, a shareholder advisory service. Disney's board then gave the chairmanship position to board member George Mitchell. However, the board did not immediately remove Eisner as chief executive.

On March 13, 2005, Eisner announced that he would step down as CEO one year before his contract expired, and handed off day-to-day duties to Bob Iger, who had been serving as Disney's President and Chief Operating Officer and had just been selected by the directors as the CEO-designate. Eisner did not initially promote Iger as a successor until after the board put pressure on Eisner to resign. To reporters and contrary to his actual intentions, Eisner remarked that "I would not have agreed to [leave] if it hadn't been Bob. Because of governance, they wanted a big search and everything. ... And by the end of the search, it was clear that I was able to convince the board—our newly constructed board—that Bob was great." Within Disney, though, Eisner was telling Board members that Iger lacked "stature". On September 30, Eisner resigned both as an executive and as a member of the board of directors, and, severing all formal ties with the company, he waived his contractual rights to perks such as the use of a corporate jet and an office at the company's Burbank headquarters.

While Eisner did much to stabilize and promote Disney in his early years as CEO, his performance in later years garnered much criticism. "Beginning with the lavish, even reckless spending on Euro Disney, and continuing with the poorly planned and executed foray into the Internet, and perhaps worst of all, the acquisition of the Fox Family cable network - each of which is a more than $1 billion mistake - Eisner squandered Disney's assets. ... This is even before considering the exit of Jeffery Katzenberg, the failure to honour his contract, and the hiring and firing of Michael Ovitz, personnel and judgment errors, which, in the cost to Disney and the vitriol and publicity they generated, are without parallel in American business history. ... Eisner controlled and manipulated the board by keeping members isolated, preferring to communicate one-on-one; selectively doling out information, access and benefits ... and ruthlessly dispatching anyone who dared challenge him."

In his book The Ride of a Lifetime, Bob Iger quotes Eisner answering criticism for micro-managing as saying: "Micromanaging is underrated".

In January 2006, Disney's corporate headquarters in Burbank was renamed to Team Disney – The Michael D. Eisner Building in Eisner's honor.

=== Post-Disney and later years ===
On October 7, 2005, Eisner was a guest host for the Charlie Rose talk show. His guests were John Travolta and his ex-boss, Barry Diller. Impressed with Eisner's performance, CNBC President Mark Hoffman hired Eisner in early 2006 to host his own talk show, Conversations with Michael Eisner. The show mostly featured CEOs, political leaders, artists and actors, until its cancellation in 2009. Eisner was also an executive producer of the show.

In March 2007, Eisner's investment firm, The Tornante Company, launched a studio, Vuguru, that produces and distributes videos for the Internet, portable media devices and cell phones. In October 2007, Eisner, through his Tornante Company investment firm, partnered with Madison Dearborn Partners in the acquisition of Topps Company, the bubble-gum and collectibles firm. He produced a mockumentary style show about his takeover of the Topps Company, called "Back on Topps." In January 2022, he sold Topps to Fanatics following its loss of the Major League Baseball licensing rights. His investment firm has funded the critically acclaimed Netflix series BoJack Horseman.

In addition to BoJack Horseman, Eisner's The Tornante Company has continued producing adult animated series for streaming platforms. His company produced Amazon Prime Video’s Undone (2019–2022) and Tuca & Bertie (2019; 2021–2022 on Adult Swim). In August 2025, Eisner's Tornante Company launched Long Story Short, a Netflix animated comedy created by BoJack Horseman’s Raphael Bob-Waksberg and produced in partnership with ShadowMachine. The show was renewed for a second season in 2025.

The College of Education at California State University, Northridge is named in his honor.

In 2009, Eisner used his own money to produce a claymation show called Glenn Martin, DDS.

He was inducted into the Television Academy Hall of Fame in 2012.

=== Portsmouth Football Club (2017–present) ===
In March 2017, Eisner revealed that he was interested in a takeover of Portsmouth F.C., a football club in the south of England that had fallen on hard times after years of poor ownership, before being taken over by its fans. The club released a statement on March 23, 2017, that Eisner and his Tornante Company were in an exclusivity agreement. On August 3, 2017, it was confirmed that Eisner and his Tornante Company had completed their purchase for a reported fee of £5.67 million.

== Personal life ==
After college in 1964, he met his future wife, Jane Breckenridge, a Unitarian of Swedish and Scottish descent. The couple married on July 22, 1967. They have three sons: Breck, Eric and Anders Eisner.

== Books ==
- Work in Progress (1998) (ISBN 0-375-50071-5)
- Camp (2005) (ISBN 978-0-446-53369-0)
- Working Together: Why Great Partnerships Succeed (2010) (ISBN 978-0-06-173236-2)

== Awards and recognition ==
- 1994 Golden Plate Award of the American Academy of Achievement
- 2001 Honor Award from the National Building Museum
- 2004 UJA-Federation of New York's Steven J. Ross Humanitarian of the Year Award
- Received a star on the Hollywood Walk of Fame in 2008.
- Inducted into the Television Academy Hall of Fame on March 1, 2012.

Business positions
Preceded by Raymond Watson	Disney Chairman; 1984–2005	Succeeded by George J. Mitchell
Preceded by Ron W. Miller	Disney CEO; 1984–2005	Succeeded by Robert Iger
