= Paul Skjodt =

Canadian-American ice hockey player and businessman

- Born: June 28, 1958 (age 68); Toronto, Ontario, Canada
- Occupation: Businessman
- Known for: Former ice hockey player
- Spouse: Cindy Simon
- Children: 3
- Relatives: Melvin Simon (father-in-law); David Simon (brother-in-law)

Paul Skjodt (born June 28, 1958) is an American-Canadian businessman, and former ice hockey player.

== Early life ==
Paul Skjodt was born in Toronto, Ontario, Canada, on June 28, 1958.

== Ice hockey career ==
From 1975, he played junior-level ice hockey for the Kitchener Rangers, Windsor Spitfires, Royal York Royals and Toronto Nationals, as well as the Erie Blades and the Crowtree Chiefs.

In 1986, Skjodt moved to Indianapolis in 1986 to pursue a career with the Indianapolis Checkers of the International Hockey League.

Skjodt founded and owned the now defunct Indiana Ice hockey team of the USHL, that won the Clark Cup Championship in 2009 and 2014.

== Property developer ==
In 2014, Skjodt was planning on building a $25 million 250,000-square-foot sports complex in northwest Indianapolis.

== Personal life ==
In 1987, he married Cindy Simon, the daughter of Melvin Simon and Bess Simon. They have three children, Erik, Samantha and Ian.

The couple are leading political donors and gave $6.6 million to the Democratic Party in the 2018 elections.

In 2015, their Samerian Foundation (founded in 2003) created a $20 million endowment, and the United States Holocaust Memorial Museum in Washington, D.C. renamed its Center for the Prevention of Genocide as The Simon-Skjodt Center for the Prevention of Genocide.
