= Världsbiblioteket =

Swedish list of the 100 best books in the world

Världsbiblioteket (The World Library) is a Swedish list of the 100 best books in the world, created in 1991 by the Swedish literary magazine Tidningen Boken. The list was compiled through votes from members of the Svenska Akademien, Swedish Crime Writers' Academy, librarian, authors and others. About 30 of the books are Swedish.

== List ==
Title	Author	Year	Country
Bible	Various	8th century BC – 2nd century AD	Ancient Near East, Roman Empire
Watership Down	Richard Adams	1972	United Kingdom
The House of the Spirits	Isabel Allende	1982	Chile
The Queen's Tiara	Carl Jonas Love Almqvist	1834	Sweden
Les Fleurs du mal (The Flowers of Evil)	Charles Baudelaire	1857	France
The Long Ships	Frans G. Bengtsson	1941–1945	Sweden
Kallocain	Karin Boye	1940	Sweden
The Death of Virgil	Hermann Broch	1945	Austria; United States
Wuthering Heights	Emily Brontë	1847	United Kingdom
The Master and Margarita	Mikhail Bulgakov	1967	Soviet Union
The Baron in the Trees	Italo Calvino	1957	Italy
The Stranger (The Outsider)	Albert Camus	1942	France
The Lost Steps	Alejo Carpentier	1953	Cuba
Alice's Adventures in Wonderland	Lewis Carroll	1865	United Kingdom
Journey to the End of the Night	Louis-Ferdinand Céline	1932	France
Don Quixote	Miguel de Cervantes	1605–1615	Spain
Story: "The Lady with the Dog"	Anton Chekhov	1899	Russia
Heart of Darkness	Joseph Conrad	1902	United Kingdom
The Divine Comedy	Dante Alighieri	1321	Republic of Florence
Samuels bok	Sven Delblanc	1981	Canada; Sweden
The Pickwick Papers	Charles Dickens	1837	United Kingdom
David Copperfield	Charles Dickens	1850	United Kingdom
Crime and Punishment	Fyodor Dostoyevsky	1866	Russia
The Idiot	Fyodor Dostoyevsky	1869	Russia
The Brothers Karamazov	Fyodor Dostoyevsky	1880	Russia
An American Tragedy	Theodore Dreiser	1925	United States
Hunden	Kerstin Ekman	1986	Sweden
Second-Class Citizen	Buchi Emecheta	1974	Nigeria; United Kingdom
Light in August	William Faulkner	1932	United States
Poems	Nils Ferlin	before 1961	Sweden
Madame Bovary	Gustave Flaubert	1857	France
Stad	Per Anders Fogelström	1960–1968	Sweden
Simon and the Oaks	Marianne Fredriksson	1985	Sweden
The Women's Room	Marilyn French	1977	United States
One Hundred Years of Solitude	Gabriel García Márquez	1967	Colombia
The Counterfeiters	André Gide	1925	France
Goethe's Faust	Johann Wolfgang von Goethe	1808	Saxe-Weimar
My Childhood	Maxim Gorky	1913–1914	Russia
The Wind in the Willows	Kenneth Grahame	1908	United Kingdom
Brighton Rock	Graham Greene	1938	United Kingdom
The Good Soldier Švejk	Jaroslav Hašek	1923	Czechoslovakia
Catch-22	Joseph Heller	1961	United States
The Sun Also Rises	Ernest Hemingway	1926	United States
The Old Man and the Sea	Ernest Hemingway	1952	United States
Steppenwolf	Hermann Hesse	1927	Germany; Switzerland
Odyssey	Homer	8th century BC	Smyrna
The World According to Garp	John Irving	1978	United States
After the Flood	P.C. Jersild	1982	Sweden
The Days of his Grace	Eyvind Johnson	1960	Sweden
Ulysses	James Joyce	1922	Ireland
The Trial	Franz Kafka	1925	Czechoslovakia
Amerika	Franz Kafka	1927	Czechoslovakia
They Burn the Thistles	Yaşar Kemal	1969	Turkey
The Czar's Madman	Jaan Kross	1978	Soviet Union (Estonia)
The Dwarf	Pär Lagerkvist	1944	Sweden
Barabbas	Pär Lagerkvist	1950	Sweden
The Emperor of Portugallia	Selma Lagerlöf	1914	Sweden
The Man Without a Way	Erik Lindegren	1942	Sweden
Pippi Longstocking	Astrid Lindgren	1945	Sweden
Mio, My Son	Astrid Lindgren	1954	Sweden
Batseba	Torgny Lindgren	1984	Sweden
The Wind on the Moon	Eric Linklater	1944	United Kingdom
The Unknown Soldier	Väinö Linna	1954	Finland
Buddenbrooks	Thomas Mann	1901	German Empire
The Magic Mountain	Thomas Mann	1924	Germany
Flowering Nettles	Harry Martinson	1935	Sweden
The Road	Harry Martinson	1948	Sweden
Aniara	Harry Martinson	1956	Sweden
The Razor's Edge	W. Somerset Maugham	1944	United Kingdom
The Thorn Birds	Colleen McCullough	1977	Australia
Winnie-the-Pooh	A. A. Milne	1926	United Kingdom
Tetralogy: The Emigrants	Vilhelm Moberg	1949–1959	Sweden
History	Elsa Morante	1974	Italy
The Book-dealer Who Ceased Bathing	Fritiof Nilsson Piraten	1937	Sweden
Doctor Zhivago	Boris Pasternak	1957	Soviet Union
Remembrance of Things Past	Marcel Proust	1913–1927	France
All Quiet on the Western Front	Erich Maria Remarque	1929	Germany
The Catcher in the Rye	J. D. Salinger	1951	United States
Alberta Trilogy	Cora Sandel	1926–1939	Norway
The Werewolf	Aksel Sandemose	1958	Denmark; Norway
Collected works	William Shakespeare	1623, 1634	England
Les Anneaux de Bicêtre	Georges Simenon	1963	Belgium
Doctor Glas	Hjalmar Söderberg	1906	Sweden
The Serious Game	Hjalmar Söderberg	1912	Sweden
Oedipus the King	Sophocles	c. 429 BC	Classical Athens
Barefoot (Desculț)	Zaharia Stancu	1948	Romania
The Grapes of Wrath	John Steinbeck	1939	United States
The Red and the Black	Stendhal	1830	France
The Charterhouse of Parma	Stendhal	1839	France
The Red Room	August Strindberg	1879	Sweden
The People of Hemsö	August Strindberg	1887	Sweden
War and Peace	Leo Tolstoy	1865–1869	Russia
Anna Karenina	Leo Tolstoy	1877	Russia
The Christmas Oratorio	Göran Tunström	1983	Sweden
Adventures of Huckleberry Finn	Mark Twain	1884	United States
Kristin Lavransdatter	Sigrid Undset	1920–1922	Norway
Twenty Thousand Leagues Under the Seas	Jules Verne	1869	France
Candide	Voltaire	1759	Kingdom of France
The House with the Blind Glass Porch	Herbjørg Wassmo	1981	Norway
Thérèse Raquin	Émile Zola	1867	France

== See also ==
- Bokklubben World Library, a Norwegian list
- Modern Library 100 Best Novels
- Modern Library 100 Best Nonfiction
- Le Monde's 100 Books of the Century
