= List of top book lists =

Many publishers have lists of best books, defined by their own criteria. This article enumerates some lists for which there are fuller articles.

Among them, Science Fiction: The 100 Best Novels (Xanadu, 1985) and Modern Fantasy: The 100 Best Novels (Grafton, 1988) are collections of 100 short essays by a single author, David Pringle, with moderately long critical introductory chapters also by Pringle. For publisher Xanadu, Science Fiction was the first of four "100 Best" books published from 1985 to 1988. The sequels covered crime and mystery, horror, and fantasy.

== Lists ==
Publisher	Name	Published	Ref
Citadel by Martin Seymour-Smith	The 100 Most Influential Books Ever Written	1998	
Crime Writers' Association	The Top 100 Crime Novels of All Time	1990	
Grafton Books by David Pringle	Modern Fantasy: The 100 Best Novels	1988	
Larry McCaffery	20th Century's Greatest Hits: 100 English-Language Books of Fiction	1999	
Le Monde	Le Monde's 100 Books of the Century	1999	
Modern Library	Modern Library 100 Best Nonfiction	1998	
Modern Library	Modern Library 100 Best Novels	1998	
Mystery Writers of America	The Top 100 Mystery Novels of All Time	1995	
New York Times Book Review	New York Times 100 Notable Books	annually	
Norwegian Book Club	Bokklubben World Library	since 2002	
Nimbus Publishing	Atlantic Canada's 100 Greatest Books	2008	
Tidningen Boken	Världsbiblioteket	1991	
Time	Time's List of the 100 Best Novels	2005	
The Guardian	The Guardian 100 best novels	2015	
Shūkan Bunshun	Tozai Mystery Best 100	1985	
Xanadu by David Pringle	Science Fiction: The 100 Best Novels	1985	

== See also ==
- Category:Top book lists
- List of books considered the best
- List of literary awards
