= Piraten =

Piraten may refer to:

- Pirate Party Germany
- Wörthersee Piraten
- Fritiof Nilsson Piraten
