= La Storia (TV series) =

Italian historical drama television series

- Italian promotional poster
- Genre: Historical drama
- Based on: History: A Novel by Elsa Morante
- Written by: Giulia Calenda; Ilaria Macchia; Francesco Piccolo
- Directed by: Francesca Archibugi
- Starring: Jasmine Trinca; Elio Germano; Asia Argento; Lorenzo Zurzolo; Francesco Zenga; Valerio Mastandrea
- Country of origin: Italy
- Original language: Italian
- No. of episodes: 8

Production
- Producer: Roberto Sessa
- Cinematography: Luca Bigazzi
- Running time: 47–59 minutes
- Production companies: Picomedia; Thalie Images; Rai Fiction

Original release
- Network: Rai 1
- Release: 8 January – 23 January 2024

La Storia (transl. History) is a 2024 Italian historical drama television miniseries based on the 1974 novel of the same name by Elsa Morante. It aired on Rai 1 from 8 January to 23 January 2024.

== Premise ==
A half-Jewish single mother deals with poverty and persecution in 1940s Rome.

== Cast ==
- Jasmine Trinca as Ida Ramundo, a single mother of Jewish and Calabrian descent
- Francesco Zenga as Antonio "Nino" Mancuso, Ida's teenage son
- Mattia Basciani as Giuseppe "Useppe", Ida's younger son
  - Christian Liberti as young Useppe
- Valerio Mastandrea as Remo, an innkeeper
- Elio Germano as Giuseppe "Eppetondo" Cucchiarelli, a communist marble worker
- Lorenzo Zurzolo as Carlo Vivaldi/Davide Segre, a Jewish student from Mantua
- Asia Argento as Santina, a prostitute and tarot reader
- Romana Maggiora Vergano as Patrizia
- Giselda Volodi as Vilma
- Anna Ferruzzo as Mrs. Di Segni
- Enzo Casertano as Tommaso Marrocco
- Lukas Zumbrock as Günther, a German soldier
- Flora Gigliosetto as Carulì
- Ludovica Ciaschetti as Mariolina

== Episodes ==
No.	Title	Duration	Original release date
1	"Episode 1"	55 min	8 January 2024
2	"Episode 2"	47 min	8 January 2024
3	"Episode 3"	55 min	15 January 2024
4	"Episode 4"	53 min	15 January 2024
5	"Episode 5"	58 min	22 January 2024
6	"Episode 6"	51 min	22 January 2024
7	"Episode 7"	55 min	23 January 2024
8	"Episode 8"	59 min	23 January 2024

== Production ==
Principal photography began in June 2022. The series was largely shot in Rome. Filming also briefly took place in Naples and Anagni.

== Release ==
The first two episodes of the series premiered at the 18th Rome Film Festival on 20 October 2023. They aired on Rai 1 two months later, on 8 January 2024, and were watched by 4.5 million viewers.

On 20 October 2023, the series was acquired by NRK for Norway, Yle for Finland, SVT for Sweden, DR for Denmark, and RÚV for Iceland. On 23 October 2024, the series was acquired by MHz Choice for the United States and Canada, and by Yes and Hot for Israel.

== Reception ==
Mattia Carzaniga of Rolling Stone Italia commended the series, particularly the performance of Jasmine Trinca, which he referred to as "perhaps her most beautiful and certainly most passionate."

== Awards and nominations ==
Year	Award	Category	Result	Ref.
2024	Nastri D'Argento Grandi Serie	Series of the Year	Won	
