= La Storia (film) =

- Directed by: Luigi Comencini
- Screenplay by: Suso Cecchi D'Amico; Cristina Comencini
- Story by: Elsa Morante
- Produced by: Paolo Infascelli
- Starring: Claudia Cardinale
- Cinematography: Franco Di Giacomo; Franco Bellomo
- Edited by: Roberto Missiroli
- Music by: Fiorenzo Carpi; Gianfranco Plenizio; Enrico Pieranunzi
- Release date: 1986
- Running time: 135 minutes (theatrical version); 270 minutes (TV version)
- Country: Italy
- Language: Italian

La Storia (History) is a 1986 Italian drama film directed by Luigi Comencini and starring Claudia Cardinale. It is based on the 1974 novel of the same name written by Elsa Morante. A shorter version of the film was released theatrically, while a 4 hours and a half version was broadcast in three parts on Rai 2 in December 1986. It premiered out of competition at the 43rd Venice International Film Festival, where Cardinale refused to appear, upset because the film had not been selected in the main competition.

== Cast ==
- Claudia Cardinale as Ida
- Francisco Rabal as Remo
- Andrea Spada as Useppe
- Antonio Degli Schiavi as Nino
- Lambert Wilson as Carlo/ Davide
- Fiorenzo Fiorentini as Cucchiarelli
- Tobias Hoesl as Günther
- Caroline Lang as Anita
- Anna Recchimuzzi as Mercedes
- Maria Teresa Albani as Wilma
- Silvana De Santis as Santina

== See also ==
- List of Italian films of 1986
