= Bokklubben World Library =

Series of classical books

Bokklubben World Library (Norwegian: Verdensbiblioteket) is a series of classical books, mostly novels, published by the Norwegian Book Clubs since 2002. It is based on a list of the hundred best books, as proposed by one hundred writers from fifty-four countries, compiled and organized in 2002 by the Book Club. This list endeavors to reflect world literature, with books from all countries, cultures, and time periods.

Each writer had to select his or her own list of ten books. The books selected by this process and listed here are not ranked or categorized in any way; the organizers have stated that "they are all on an equal footing," with the exception of Don Quixote which was given the distinction "best literary work ever written."

Fyodor Dostoevsky is the author with the most books on the list, with four. William Shakespeare, Franz Kafka, and Leo Tolstoy each have three.

== Breakdown of voters and list ==
The writers surveyed included 69 men and 31 women. 85 of the books included on the list are written by men, 11 are written by women, and four have unknown authors. 26 of the 100 voting writers had English as their first language.

== List of books ==
Title	Author	Year	Country	Language
Things Fall Apart	Chinua Achebe	1958	Nigeria	English
Fairy Tales	Hans Christian Andersen	1835–37	Denmark	Danish
Divine Comedy	Dante Alighieri	1308–21	Italy	Italian
Epic of Gilgamesh	Unknown	18th – 17th century BCE	Sumer / Akkadian Empire	Akkadian
Book of Job	Unknown	7th – 4th century BCE	Achaemenid Empire	Biblical Hebrew
One Thousand and One Nights	Various	700–1500	Iraq/Iran/India/Syria/Egypt/Tajikistan	Arabic
Njál's Saga	Unknown, possibly Sæmundr fróði	13th century	Iceland	Old Norse
Pride and Prejudice	Jane Austen	1813	United Kingdom	English
Le Père Goriot	Honoré de Balzac	1835	France	French
The Trilogy: Molloy, Malone Dies, The Unnamable	Samuel Beckett	1951–53	Republic of Ireland	French, English
The Decameron	Giovanni Boccaccio	1349–53	Italy	Italian
Ficciones	Jorge Luis Borges	1944–56	Argentina	Spanish
Wuthering Heights	Emily Brontë	1847	United Kingdom	English
The Stranger	Albert Camus	1942	Algeria, French Empire	French
Poems	Paul Celan	1952	Romania, USSR, France	German
Journey to the End of the Night	Louis-Ferdinand Céline	1932	France	French
Don Quixote	Miguel de Cervantes	1605 (part 1), 1615 (part 2)	Spain	Spanish
The Canterbury Tales	Geoffrey Chaucer	1380s–1400	England	English
Stories	Anton Chekhov	1886	Russia	Russian
Nostromo	Joseph Conrad	1904	United Kingdom	English
Great Expectations	Charles Dickens	1861	United Kingdom	English
Jacques the Fatalist	Denis Diderot	1796	France	French
Berlin Alexanderplatz	Alfred Döblin	1929	Germany	German
Crime and Punishment	Fyodor Dostoevsky	1866	Russia	Russian
The Idiot	Fyodor Dostoevsky	1869	Russia	Russian
Demons	Fyodor Dostoevsky	1872	Russia	Russian
The Brothers Karamazov	Fyodor Dostoevsky	1880	Russia	Russian
Middlemarch	George Eliot	1871	United Kingdom	English
Invisible Man	Ralph Ellison	1952	United States	English
Medea	Euripides	431 BCE	Greece	Ancient Greek
Absalom, Absalom!	William Faulkner	1936	United States	English
The Sound and the Fury	William Faulkner	1929	United States	English
Madame Bovary	Gustave Flaubert	1857	France	French
Sentimental Education	Gustave Flaubert	1869	France	French
Gypsy Ballads	Federico García Lorca	1928	Spain	Spanish
One Hundred Years of Solitude	Gabriel García Márquez	1967	Colombia	Spanish
Love in the Time of Cholera	Gabriel García Márquez	1985	Colombia	Spanish
Faust	Johann Wolfgang von Goethe	1832	Saxe-Weimar	German
Dead Souls	Nikolai Gogol	1842	Russia	Russian
The Tin Drum	Günter Grass	1959	Germany	German
The Devil to Pay in the Backlands	João Guimarães Rosa	1956	Brazil	Portuguese
Hunger	Knut Hamsun	1890	Norway	Norwegian
The Old Man and the Sea	Ernest Hemingway	1952	United States	English
Iliad	Homer	760–710 BCE	Greece	Ancient Greek
Odyssey	Homer	8th century BCE	Greece	Ancient Greek
A Doll's House	Henrik Ibsen	1879	Norway	Norwegian
Ulysses	James Joyce	1922	Irish Free State	English
Stories	Franz Kafka	1924	Czechoslovakia	German
The Trial	Franz Kafka	1925	Czechoslovakia	German
The Castle	Franz Kafka	1926	Czechoslovakia	German
Shakuntala	Kālidāsa	1st century BCE – 4th century CE	India	Sanskrit
The Sound of the Mountain	Yasunari Kawabata	1954	Japan	Japanese
Zorba the Greek	Nikos Kazantzakis	1946	Greece	Greek
Sons and Lovers	D. H. Lawrence	1913	United Kingdom	English
Independent People	Halldór Laxness	1934–35	Iceland	Icelandic
Complete Poems	Giacomo Leopardi	1818–1835	Italy	Italian
The Golden Notebook	Doris Lessing	1962	United Kingdom	English
Pippi Longstocking	Astrid Lindgren	1945	Sweden	Swedish
Diary of a Madman and Other Stories	Lu Xun	1918	China	Chinese
Children of Gebelawi	Naguib Mahfouz	1959	Egypt	Arabic
Buddenbrooks	Thomas Mann	1901	Germany	German
The Magic Mountain	Thomas Mann	1924	Germany	German
Moby-Dick	Herman Melville	1851	United States	English
Essays	Michel de Montaigne	1595	France	French
History	Elsa Morante	1974	Italy	Italian
Beloved	Toni Morrison	1987	United States	English
The Tale of Genji	Murasaki Shikibu	1000–12	Japan	Japanese
The Man Without Qualities	Robert Musil	1930–32	Austria	German
Lolita	Vladimir Nabokov	1955	Russia/United States	English
Nineteen Eighty-Four	George Orwell	1949	United Kingdom	English
Metamorphoses	Ovid	1st century CE	Roman Empire	Classical Latin
The Book of Disquiet	Fernando Pessoa	1928	Portugal	Portuguese
Tales	Edgar Allan Poe	1832–49	United States	English
In Search of Lost Time	Marcel Proust	1913–27	France	French
Gargantua and Pantagruel	François Rabelais	1532–34	France	French
Pedro Páramo	Juan Rulfo	1955	Mexico	Spanish
Masnavi	Rumi	1258–73	Iran	Persian
Midnight's Children	Salman Rushdie	1981	United Kingdom, India	English
Bostan	Saadi	1257	Iran	Persian
Season of Migration to the North	Tayeb Salih	1966	Sudan	Arabic
Blindness	José Saramago	1995	Portugal	Portuguese
Hamlet	William Shakespeare	1603	England	English
King Lear	William Shakespeare	1608	England	English
Othello	William Shakespeare	1609	England	English
Oedipus the King	Sophocles	430 BCE	Greece	Ancient Greek
The Red and the Black	Stendhal	1830	France	French
Tristram Shandy	Laurence Sterne	1760	Ireland	English
Confessions of Zeno	Italo Svevo	1923	Italy	Italian
Gulliver's Travels	Jonathan Swift	1726	Ireland	English
War and Peace	Leo Tolstoy	1865–69	Russia	Russian
Anna Karenina	Leo Tolstoy	1877	Russia	Russian
The Death of Ivan Ilyich and Other Stories	Leo Tolstoy	1886	Russia	Russian
Adventures of Huckleberry Finn	Mark Twain	1884	United States	English
Ramayana	Valmiki	5th – 4th century BCE	India	Sanskrit
Aeneid	Virgil	29–19 BCE	Roman Empire	Classical Latin
Mahabharata	Vyasa	9th – 5th century BCE	India	Sanskrit
Leaves of Grass	Walt Whitman	1855	United States	English
Mrs Dalloway	Virginia Woolf	1925	United Kingdom	English
To the Lighthouse	Virginia Woolf	1927	United Kingdom	English
Memoirs of Hadrian	Marguerite Yourcenar	1951	France/Belgium	French

== List of authors surveyed ==
Name	Country
Chinghiz Aitmatov	Kyrgyzstan
Ahmet Altan	Turkey
Aharon Appelfeld	Israel
Paul Auster	United States
Félix de Azúa	Spain
Julian Barnes	United Kingdom
Simin Behbahani	Iran
Robert Bly	United States
André Brink	South Africa
Suzanne Brøgger	Denmark
A. S. Byatt	United Kingdom
Peter Carey	Australia
Martha Cerda	Mexico
Jung Chang	China/United Kingdom
Maryse Condé	France
Mia Couto	Mozambique
Jim Crace	United Kingdom
Edwidge Danticat	Haiti
Bei Dao	China
Assia Djebar	Algeria
Mahmoud Dowlatabadi	Iran
Jean Echenoz	France
Kerstin Ekman	Sweden
Nathan Englander	United States
Hans Magnus Enzensberger	Germany
Abilio Estévez	Cuba
Nuruddin Farah	Somalia
Kjartan Fløgstad	Norway
Jon Fosse	Norway
Janet Frame	New Zealand
Marilyn French	United States
Carlos Fuentes	Mexico
Izzat Ghazzawi	Palestine
Amitav Ghosh	India
Pere Gimferrer	Spain
Nadine Gordimer	South Africa
David Grossman	Israel
Einar Már Guðmundsson	Iceland
Seamus Heaney	Ireland
Christoph Hein	Germany
Aleksandar Hemon	Bosnia-Herzegovina
Alice Hoffman	United States
Chenjerai Hove	Zimbabwe
Sonallah Ibrahim	Egypt
John Irving	United States
P. C. Jersild	Sweden
Yasar Kemal	Turkey
Jan Kjærstad	Norway
Milan Kundera	Czech Republic/France
Leena Lander	Finland
John le Carré	United Kingdom
Siegfried Lenz	Germany
Doris Lessing	United Kingdom
Astrid Lindgren	Sweden
Viivi Luik	Estonia
Amin Maalouf	Lebanon/France
Claudio Magris	Italy
Norman Mailer	United States
Tomás Eloy Martínez	Argentina
Frank McCourt	Ireland/United States
Gita Mehta	India
Ana Miranda	Brazil
Rohinton Mistry	India/Canada
Abdel Rahman Munif	Saudi Arabia
Herta Müller	Romania
V. S. Naipaul	Trinidad/United Kingdom
Cees Nooteboom	Netherlands
Ben Okri	Nigeria/United Kingdom
Orhan Pamuk	Turkey
Sara Paretsky	United States
Jayne Anne Phillips	United States
Valentin Rasputin	Russia
João Ubaldo Ribeiro	Brazil
Alain Robbe-Grillet	France
Salman Rushdie	India/United Kingdom
Nawal El Saadawi	Egypt
Hanan al-Shaykh	Lebanon
Nihad Sirees	Syria
Göran Sonnevi	Sweden
Susan Sontag	United States
Wole Soyinka	Nigeria
Gerold Späth	Switzerland
Graham Swift	United Kingdom
Antonio Tabucchi	Italy
Fouad al-Tikerly	Iraq
D. M. Thomas	United Kingdom
Adam Thorpe	United Kingdom
Kirsten Thorup	Denmark
Aleksandr Tkachenko	Russia
Pramoedya Ananta Toer	Indonesia
Olga Tokarczuk	Poland
Michel Tournier	France
Jean-Philippe Toussaint	Belgium
Mehmed Uzun	Turkey
Nils-Aslak Valkeapää	Sápmi
Vassilis Vassilikos	Greece
Yvonne Vera	Zimbabwe
Fay Weldon	United Kingdom
Christa Wolf	Germany
A. B. Yehoshua	Israel
Spôjmaï Zariâb	Afghanistan

== See also ==
- Classic book
- Larry McCaffery's list of the 20th Century's Greatest Hits: 100 English-Language Books of Fiction
- Le Monde's 100 Books of the Century
- Lists of 100 best books
- List of books banned by governments
- Marcel Reich-Ranicki's anthology of exemplary German literature Der Kanon
- Modern Library 100 Best Novels
- Modern Library 100 Best Nonfiction
- Världsbiblioteket, a Swedish "100 best books" list from 1991
- Western canon
- World literature
