= List of English-language books considered the best =

This is a list of English-language novels that multiple media outlets and commentators have considered to be among the best of all time. The books included on this list are on at least three "best/greatest of all time" lists.

== List ==
| Name | Author | Year | Ref. | Ref. Count |
|---|---|---|---|---|
| Absalom, Absalom! | William Faulkner | 1936 | | 4 |
| The Adventures of Augie March | Saul Bellow | 1953 | | 3 |
| The Adventures of Huckleberry Finn | Mark Twain | 1885 | | 5 |
| All The King's Men | Robert Penn Warren | 1946 | | 3 |
| Animal Farm | George Orwell | 1945 | | 6 |
| Appointment in Samarra | John O'Hara | 1934 | | 3 |
| Atonement | Ian McEwan | 2001 | | 3 |
| Beloved | Toni Morrison | 1987 | | 6 |
| A Bend in the River | V. S. Naipaul | 1979 | | 3 |
| The Big Sleep | Raymond Chandler | 1939 | | 4 |
| Bleak House | Charles Dickens | 1852-1853 | | 3 |
| Blood Meridian | Cormac McCarthy | 1985 | | 3 |
| Brave New World | Aldous Huxley | 1932 | | 5 |
| Catch-22 | Joseph Heller | 1961 | | 6 |
| The Catcher in the Rye | J. D. Salinger | 1951 | | 9 |
| A Clockwork Orange | Anthony Burgess | 1963 | | 3 |
| A Dance to the Music of Time | Anthony Powell | 1951-75 | | 3 |
| David Copperfield | Charles Dickens | 1849-1850 | | 4 |
| The Day of the Locust | Nathanael West | 1939 | | 3 |
| Deliverance | James Dickey | 1970 | | 3 |
| East of Eden | John Steinbeck | 1952 | | 3 |
| Emma | Jane Austen | 1816 | | 4 |
| The Golden Notebook | Doris Lessing | 1962 | | 4 |
| The Good Soldier | Ford Madox Ford | 1915 | | 3 |
| Go Tell It on the Mountain | James Baldwin | 1953 | | 3 |
| The Grapes of Wrath | John Steinbeck | 1939 | | 8 |
| Gravity's Rainbow | Thomas Pynchon | 1973 | | 4 |
| Great Expectations | Charles Dickens | 1860-1861 | | 4 |
| The Great Gatsby | F. Scott Fitzgerald | 1925 | | 10 |
| Heart of Darkness | Joseph Conrad | 1899 | | 5 |
| Infinite Jest | David Foster Wallace | 1996 | | 4 |
| Jane Eyre | Charlotte Brontë | 1847 | | 4 |
| The Life and Opinions of Tristram Shandy, Gentleman | Laurence Sterne | 1759-1767 | | 3 |
| Light in August | William Faulkner | 1932 | | 3 |
| Lolita | Vladimir Nabokov | 1955 | | 12 |
| Lord of the Flies | William Golding | 1954 | | 4 |
| The Lord of the Rings | J. R. R. Tolkien | 1954 | | 6 |
| The Maltese Falcon | Dashiell Hammett | 1930 | | 3 |
| Moby-Dick | Herman Melville | 1851 | | 5 |
| The Moviegoer | Walker Percy | 1961 | | 3 |
| Lucky Jim | Kingsley Amis | 1954 | | 3 |
| Middlemarch | George Eliot | 1871 | | 6 |
| Midnight's Children | Salman Rushdie | 1981 | | 6 |
| Mrs. Dalloway | Virginia Woolf | 1925 | | 6 |
| Native Son | Richard Wright | 1940 | | 3 |
| Nineteen Eighty-Four | George Orwell | 1949 | | 8 |
| Of Human Bondage | W. Somerset Maugham | 1915 | | 3 |
| Of Mice and Men | John Steinbeck | 1937 | | 3 |
| On The Road | Jack Kerouac | 1957 | | 5 |
| A Passage to India | E. M. Forster | 1924 | | 4 |
| Persuasion | Jane Austen | 1818 | | 3 |
| Portnoy's Complaint | Philip Roth | 1969 | | 3 |
| Pride and Prejudice | Jane Austen | 1813 | | 6 |
| The Prime of Miss Jean Brodie | Muriel Spark | 1961 | | 3 |
| Rebecca | Daphne du Maurier | 1938 | | 4 |
| The Red Badge of Courage | Stephen Crane | 1895 | | 3 |
| Scoop | Evelyn Waugh | 1938 | | 3 |
| Sophie's Choice | William Styron | 1979 | | 3 |
| The Sound and the Fury | William Faulkner | 1929 | | 6 |
| The Sun Also Rises | Ernest Hemingway | 1926 | | 3 |
| To Kill a Mockingbird | Harper Lee | 1960 | | 6 |
| To the Lighthouse | Virginia Woolf | 1927 | | 7 |
| Tropic of Cancer | Henry Miller | 1934 | | 3 |
| Ulysses | James Joyce | 1922 | | 10 |
| Under the Net | Iris Murdoch | 1954 | | 3 |
| Under the Volcano | Malcolm Lowry | 1947 | | 4 |
| Wide Sargasso Sea | Jean Rhys | 1966 | | 3 |
| Wuthering Heights | Emily Brontë | 1847 | | 5 |

== Publications ==
- Time's List of the 100 Best Novels (2005)
- NPR's 100 Years, 100 Novels (2009) (2)
- Modern Library 100 Best Novels (1998)
- The Daily Telegraph's 100 Novels Everyone Should Read
- The Guardian's 100 Best Novels Written in English (2015)
- Le Monde's 100 Books of the Century (1999)
- BBC's The Big Read (2003)

== See also ==
- Category:Top book lists
- List of top book lists
- List of literary awards
