= Bokhandlaren som slutade bada =

Book by Fritiof Nilsson Piraten

Bokhandlaren som slutade bada (The Bookseller Who Gave Up Bathing, 1937) is a novel by Fritiof Nilsson Piraten. The book would be adapted as a film and placed on Världsbiblioteket. The film version was directed by Jarl Kulle and concerns a bachelor, and book-seller, who marries a mysterious widow.
