= Paraliterature =

Works dismissed as not literary

Paraliterature comprises written works dismissed as not literary. It includes commercial fiction, popular fiction, pulp fiction, comic books and, most notably, genre fiction with works of science fiction, fantasy, mystery and others.^{:361}

The term was originally used in French literary studies to 'designate a phenomenon characteristic of the age of mass communications - the fantastic spread of a mass literature', and as early as 1970 a special collection of critical articles on paraliterature appeared in France.^{:95-96} Art critic and scholar Rosalind Krauss brought the term to prominence in the United States through her text 'Poststructuralism and the "Paraliterary"' (1980). Krauss argues the paraliterary is 'the space of debate, quotation, partisanship, betrayal, reconciliation; but it is not the space of unity, coherence, or resolution that we think of as constituting the work of literature.'^{:37} She links the paraliterary to postmodern literature, noting 'it is not surprising that the medium of a postmodernist literature should be the critical text wrought into a paraliterary form.'^{:37}

On the term "paraliterature", Ursula K. Le Guin commented that "it exists. What I'm saying is that I don't want to perpetuate this division. So I would always put it in quotes, or do something to show that I'm rejecting a word that I have to use".^{:182}

== See also ==
- Gray literature
- Paracinema
- List of books considered the best
