= Jeffrey Sconce =

American academic and cultural historian

Jeffrey Sconce is a professor and cultural historian of media and film. He is a professor in the Screen Cultures program at Northwestern University.

== Early life and education ==
Sconce has a B.A., B.S., and M.A. from the University of Texas, Austin, and a Ph.D. from the University of Wisconsin Madison.

== Career ==
He is the author of The Technical Delusion: Electronics, Power, Insanity, published by Duke University Press in 2019, and Haunted Media: Electronic Presence from Telegraphy to Television, published by Duke University Press in 2000. Chapters from Haunted Media have been translated into French and German. He is also the editor of Sleaze Artists: Cinema at the Margins of Taste, Style, and Financing, published by Duke University Press in 2007.

As a media historian, Sconce's work concentrates primarily on the occult, supernatural, and psychotic accounts of electronic media technologies.

His 1995 article, "Trashing the Academy: Taste, Excess and an Emerging Politics of Cinematic Style," introduced the concept of paracinema, meaning an interest in "low" and critically derided forms of cinema. "Trashing the Academy" has been reprinted in several anthologies on cult film.

His 2002 article, "Irony, Nihilism, and the New American 'Smart' Cinema," introduced the concept of "smart cinema" to describe the stylistic and thematic interests of American independent filmmakers such as Paul Thomas Anderson, Todd Solondz, Neil LaBute, and Todd Haynes.

Sconce has also written exhibition catalog essays for several contemporary visual artists, including Tony Oursler, Mike Kelley, Joshua Bonnetta, and Romeo Grünfelder.

== Awards ==
- Guggenheim Fellowship, 2020-2021

== Selected works ==
- The Technical Delusion: Electronics, Power, Insanity, Duke University Press (2019)
- "When Worlds Collide," Exploded Fortress of Solitude, Gagosian/Rizzoli (2012)
- Sleaze Artists: Cinema at the Margins of Taste, Style, and Financing, Duke University Press (2007)
- “What If? Charting Television’s New Textual Boundaries.” Television After TV, Lynn Spigel and Jan Olssen, editors. Duke University Press, 2004.
- “Irony, Nihilism, and the New American ‘Smart’ Cinema.” Screen 43:4 (2002).
- Haunted Media: Electronic Presence from Telegraphy to Television, Duke University Press, 2000.
- "'Trashing' the academy: Taste, Excess, and an Emerging Politics of Cinematic Style." Screen Volume 36, Number 4 (1995).
