= Lies and Sorcery =

1948 novel by Elsa Morante

- Menzogna e sortilega, First Edition Cover
- Author: Elsa Morante
- Original title: Menzogna e sortilegio
- Language: Italian
- Genres: novel
- Set in: Palermo, Italy
- Publisher: Giulio Einaudi editore
- Publication date: 1948

Lies and Sorcery (Italian: Menzogna e sortilegio) is a novel by the Italian writer Elsa Morante published in 1948, set in Southern Italy at the turn of the 20th century, describing a family's escape from increasingly dire financial and social circumstances into wishful thinking and delusions. The narrative covers three generations of a family in decline, blending elements of the fairy tale as well as the social novel and the coming-of-age-story. In the year of its publication the novel received the Premio Viareggio.

== Plot ==
Elisa, a young woman from Southern Italy, lives as a recluse with her cordial, but fickle adoptive mother, the courtesan Rosaria, who loves but frequently neglects her. Her only company are the ghosts of her past, populating her lively imagination. After Rosaria's death Elisa tries to free herself from these ghosts by writing down her family's history.

When Elisa's grandfather, the nobleman Teodoro, marries the significantly younger Cesira, an ambitious governess from the countryside, the resulting scandal leads to a break with his family. No longer able to obtain credit, the spendthrift Teodoro sees his palace seized by creditors and has to take up more modest lodgings in a working-class neighbourhood, where he spends most of his days brokering rarely lucrative deals in shady taverns, while his wife Cesira feeds the family by giving private lessons. Constantly on the run from the bitter reality and Cesira's reproaches, Teodoro slowly drinks himself to death. To his daughter Anna however, he remains a perfect gentleman to the end, who treats her like a princess and charms her with lively tales of past glory and tantalizing promises of future travels.

After her father's death, Anna transfers this blind adulation to her rich cousin Eduardo, whom she meets by chance during one of his youthful pranks. While Eduardo writes her love songs, serenades her in front of her window, and even gives her an engagement ring, he also enjoys tormenting her with jealous suspicions and raves about travel plans that do not include her. In contrast to her mother, Anna realizes that the status-obsessed Eduardo would never actually marry her, but wants to have a child from him anyway - in the throes of passion, she longs to sacrifice her reputation, without expecting anything in a return, as a testament to her love. Eduardo however always withdraws at the last moment. After a health scare, he vows to change his ways and starts to view Anna as an unpleasant reminder of a past he wants to leave behind, to be unceremoniously discarded by a break-up letter without further explanation of reasons.

Another victim of Eduardo's desire to abandon his old life is his former friend Francesco di Salvo, a young student from the countryside with big dreams of fame and revolution, which however never lessen his completely uncritical reverence for Eduard's title and wealth. Francesco loves the former courtesan Rosaria, whom he regards as his wife-to-be in spite of his general distaste for the bourgeois convention of marriage - until Eduardo makes fun of her, which irrevocably lowers her in Francesco's esteem. When Francesco finds evidence that Rosaria has been cheating on him, he is secretly glad for the pretext to end the relationship, since he is already in love with someone else: Eduardo's cousin Anna.

Francesco never learns that it was Eduardo who seduced the good-natured but pleasure-loving Rosaria with flatteries and gifts. Eduardo immediately jilts Rosaria and urges her, using partly threats, partly blackmail, to skip town. Parting in bitterness, Rosaria prophesies his imminent demise. Her prophesy comes true when Eduard falls ill soon after, and eventually dies of consumption.

In the meantime, Anna has married Francesco, who has given up his studies and took up employment with the post office to be able to feed his new family. Although Anna never hides her contempt for her husband and her purely financial motivation for agreeing to the marriage, Francesco clings to the hope that she will come to love him in time. But Anna not only never warms up to Francesco, she also fails to reciprocate the love of their daughter Elisa, whom she treats like a burden forced upon her.

While taking Elisa for a walk, Francesco runs into the newly returned Rosaria, who immediately tries to win him back. Not even Francesco's most blatant expressions of disdain can discourage her. Despite his misgivings, Francesco starts meeting her regularly, initially accompanied by Elisa, later alone, but continues to love only Anna.

The news of Eduardo's death plunge Anna into a profound crisis. She fakes letters from Eduardo to read them to his delusional mother, who refuses to accept the reality of her son's death. Anna soon joins her aunt in her delusions and starts to prescribe herself increasingly harsh punishments in the name of Eduardo, culminating in a confession of infidelity to Fransceso. Her plan is to provoke her husband to a crime of passion, so that she can join Eduardo in death.

But the jealous Francesco never follows through with his threats, repeatedly recoiling at the last minute. When he dies in a work accident, trying and failing to jump on a moving train, Anna suffers a nervous breakdown. She is found on the brink of death by Rosaria, who has read about Francesco's death in the newspaper and has come to blame Anna. Anna accepts the blame. She identifies the ring on Rosaria's finger as the engagement ring she gave back to Eduardo when they broke up and reclaims it. Moved by awe and pity for the dying woman, Rosaria not only honours her request, but also pays for a nurse for Anna and takes care of Elisa.

Weakened by her self-inflected tortures in the name of an imaginary Eduardo, Anna dies of exhaustion after several days of agony. Rosaria adopts Elisa and hands her the forged letters she found in Anna's possession. Elisa plans to burn them after finishing her account.

== Themes ==
The novel depicts a regressive, closed-off and repressive society in a region which apparently has not seen much change since Norman rule. All social interactions are characterized by strict hierarchies and stark tensions between miserable poverty and great luxury, pagan superstitions and the Catholic cult of mercy.

This sense of being trapped in traditional structures is also reflected on a psycho-analytical level: the central family's tragedy can be described as generational pattern of narcissistic love, resulting in the subject's over-identification with an unavailable love-object and subsequent self-destruction. Only the family's last scion, the novel's narrator, shows some promise of escaping the pattern by processing the family's downfall through literature.

== Form ==
The novel's polyphonic narrative shifts between dream and reality, fairy tale and realism. The first part of the novel is dominated by the prose style of fairy-tales, culminating in the description of the romance between Anna and Eduardo. This dream-like quality of the novel is replaced by more realistic portrayal of events in the second half of the novel, increasingly concerned with depicting the social environment.

The structure as well as the titles of chapters, the narrative situation and the manner in which psychological conflicts are dramatized reminded critics of narrative conventions from the 19th century. The juxtaposition of omniscient and subjective points of view, the frequent direct interventions by the fictional narrator, the use of flashbacks and digressions, the insertion of poetry and the balance of psychological character analysis and depiction of social milieu are typical for Morante's writing.

== Biographical Elements ==
Dysfunctional families are a recurring theme in Elsa Morante's novels. Strained bonds between mother and daughter as well as intransparent family relations can also be found in Morante's own life. Like Elisa, the fictional narrator of House of Liars, Elsa grew up in a working-class neighborhood with a mother who frequently suffered from mental breakdowns and showed open hostility to her husband while pining for another man. In the novel, Elisa's mother's true love remains unconsummated and ultimately one-sided. In reality, Elsa eventually found that her mother's lover, introduced to her as an "uncle" and friend of the family, was actually her biological father.

== Literary Influences ==
When the novel was published in 1948, it resisted immediate categorization. The literary trends of the time were reflected by socially critical modernism, represented by writers such as Elio Vittorini, Cesare Pavese or Natalia Ginzburg, who were mainly concerned with the modernisation of post-war Italy, opting for minimalist, simple narration for the purpose, in contrast to Morante, who uses ornate, sensual language, complex syntax and archaic and mythical allusion to imbue the characters and events in her novel with a timeless quality.

The clearest parallels to House of Liars can be found in the epic tradition of chivalric romance, represented by works such as the Ludovico Ariosto epic poem Orlando Furioso and the Miguel de Cervantes novel Don Quijote. Traces of this tradition can still be found in the Sicilian marionnette theatre of Opera dei Pupi. The gloomy atmosphere of the novel also invited comparisons to the Brontë sisters, Dostojevski, Melville, Julien Green and Edgar Allan Poe.

== Reception ==
In the year of its publication the novel received the Premio Viareggio, turning Elsa Morante, who had been previously mainly known for her short stories, into an overnight-sensation. The critic Georg Lukács ranked Menzogna e sortilegio among the most important Italian works of literature of the century.

But the novel turned out to be polarizing, attracting passionate praise as well as vehement criticism - the novel's critics found it 100 pages too long, its characters too numerous, the result confusing. They also mocked the old-fashioned prose style and narrative conventions, reminding of the 19th century. Like France, post-war Italy was characterized by passionate polemics about the relationship between political activism, realism and art - a seemingly apolitical novel like Menzogna e sortilegio, mainly concerned with poetry and emotions, did not capture the spirit of the time and attracted the ire of staunch communists. This impression of the novel's lack of political concerns however was not shared by everyone: Italo Calvino warns against getting deceived by the picturesque charms of the narrative and points out the underlying analysis of the class system.

Three years after its first publication, the novel was translated for the American market and published under the title House of Liars. The American edition was not well received - the novel had been shortened by almost 20% and the critics found many faults with the quality of the translation. One critic even likened it to a guillotine, killing with one blow all hopes Morante might have had for finding success with English speaking audiences.

A new translation by Jenny McPhee under the title 'Lies and Sorcery' was published by New York Review Books in 2023. Lucy Scholes of the Financial Times wrote, "Jenny McPhee’s robust but exquisite new translation allows English-speaking readers to experience Morante’s masterpiece in full for the very first time."
