= Mr. Mike's Mondo Video =

1979 film by Michael O'Donoghue

- Directed by: Michael O'Donoghue
- Written by: Michael O'Donoghue; Mitch Glazer; Dirk Wittenborn; Emily Prager
- Starring: Michael O'Donoghue; Dan Aykroyd; Bill Murray; Gilda Radner; Sid Vicious
- Cinematography: Barry Rebo
- Edited by: Alan Miller
- Distributed by: New Line Cinema
- Release date: September 21, 1979
- Running time: 75 minutes
- Country: United States
- Language: English

Mr. Mike's Mondo Video is a 1979 American mondo-mockumentary film conceived and directed by Saturday Night Live writer/cast member Michael O'Donoghue. It is a spoof of the controversial 1962 documentary Mondo Cane, showing people doing weird stunts (the logo for Mr. Mike's Mondo Video copies the original Mondo Cane logo).

Many cast members of Saturday Night Live, including Dan Aykroyd, Jane Curtin, Laraine Newman, Bill Murray, Don Novello and Gilda Radner, appear in Mr. Mike's Mondo Video. People who had previously hosted SNL, or would go on to host (such as Carrie Fisher, Margot Kidder and Teri Garr) make cameo appearances in the film.

Others who appear in the film include musicians Sid Vicious, Paul Shaffer, Debbie Harry, Root Boy Slim, and Klaus Nomi; artist Robert Delford Brown; and model Patty Oja.

== History ==
Mr. Mike's Mondo Video was originally produced on videotape as an NBC television special that would have aired in place of Saturday Night Live during one of its live breaks. Because of the special's vulgar and tasteless content, NBC declared that it did not meet the network's programming standards and shelved it. Shortly thereafter, O'Donoghue met former NBC programming head Paul Klein at a party where the project was discussed; Klein was inspired to make a deal with NBC to pay the network the $300,000 it cost to produce the show in exchange for the rights to release it to movie theaters. The show was transferred from videotape to 35mm film for the release.

To pad the program to feature length, filmmaker Walter Williams created a special Mr. Bill Show episode, combining footage from his past Mr. Bill shorts from SNL with new wraparound scenes to present at the head of the film as a short subject. Co-writer Mitchell Glazer states in the DVD's audio commentary that many other scenes were added to pad the film's runtime to the required 90 minutes for theatrical releases. However, some theaters showed a straight transfer of the master tape of the special, which included slots calling for the insertion of commercials.

The film would eventually be seen on television, albeit on pay cable and syndication, with several cuts, such as the non–sequitur "Dream Sequences".

Mr. Mike's Mondo Video was released on home video in the early 1980s through Mike Nesmith's Pacific Arts label. In January 2009, the film was released on DVD by Shout! Factory. The DVD and video tape releases mute the infamous "My Way" segment (see below) and remove Mr. Mike's lead-in to the "Church of the Jack Lord" segment due to the inability of Shout! Factory to get the rights to use the Hawaii Five-O theme song.

== Plot ==
The film is largely plotless, comprising a series of vignettes linked together by interstitial pieces in which Mr. Mike discusses how upsetting and odd the sequences are. He introduces some of the pieces via voiceover, while others have no introduction.

Sequences include:

- Aykroyd displaying his webbed toes which he prodded with a screwdriver to prove they were not make-up.
- A church that worships Jack Lord as the one true god (also featuring Dan Aykroyd).
- A French restaurant that prides itself on how poorly it treats American patrons.
- A sequence where the movie's "guide" takes viewers on a tour of an Amsterdam-based school that teaches cats how to swim, so they won't drown in the city's many canals.
- Several of the regular SNL female cast members at the time, including Jane Curtin and Gilda Radner, listing a wide variety of disgusting things men can do that would turn them on, including having "a full, firm colostomy bag".
- "Dream Sequence" — a series of surreal film pieces bracketed by large light-up signs reading "Dream Sequence" and "End Dream Sequence" that track towards and away from the camera. One of these is merely performance footage of Klaus Nomi, while another features home movie footage shot by Emily Prager intercut with stop-motion animation.
- Jo Jo, The Human Hot Plate — a quick cutaway to performance artist Robert Delford Brown, smiling, undulating and dressed only in a pair of briefs while holding canned spaghetti in his cupped hands.
- The presentation of a classified government weapons project, "Laserbra 2000". This piece is the last of a triptych of sequences that chronicle attempts to obtain the classified footage. In the first, the film (secreted in a violin case) is in fact someone's home movies; in the second, the violin case contains a violin. National Lampoon writer Brian McConnachie appears in the footage as a scientist.
- Short films made by other directors:
  - "Cleavage" by Mitchell Kriegman — closeup of a hand working its way out from (what is implied to be) between a large pair of breasts, feeling around gently, realizing where it is, and working its way back in.
  - "Crowd Scene Take One", by Andy Aaron and Ernie Fosselius — purports to be a director guiding background actors for a disaster movie scene.
  - "Uncle Si and the Sirens" — anonymously-directed silent-era "nudie-cutie" short found by SNL alumnus Tom Schiller.

== Music ==
Mondo Cane features the hit song "More" (which was initially an instrumental song with words added later), sung by crooner Julius La Rosa. In Mr. Mike's Mondo Video, O'Donoghue and writer Emily Prager (who also act in the film) take the instrumental song "Telstar" by Joe Meek and add lyrics to it, creating "The Haunting Theme Song", also sung by La Rosa. The song is sung in English during the opening credits, and in nonsense Italian over the closing credits.

=== Sid Vicious appearance ===
Mondo Video features Sid Vicious performing the classic song "My Way" from The Great Rock 'n' Roll Swindle, which had not yet been released in America at the time. On the initial Pacific Arts home video release, the audio is muted before Vicious begins singing. A crawl appears onscreen explaining that the owners of the song's copyright would not permit audio of the performance to be included on the tape: "It wasn't a case of money", the crawl explains, "they wouldn't even discuss it." The sound returns when the performance switches to a heavy punk rock guitar riff, and Sid pulling out a gun, firing (presumably blanks) into the audience, flipping them the bird, and walking off.

The muted audio and explanatory crawl are carried over on the 2009 Shout! Factory release, despite the fact that the Sid Vicious version of the song can be seen and heard, in its entirety, in the DVD release of The Great Rock'n'Roll Swindle, also released by Shout! Factory.

== Reception ==
The film received reviews ranging from mixed to scathing.

Vincent Canby of The New York Times wrote that the "most depressing thing" about the film "is that there are beginnings of funny sketches all over the place but they've been abandoned before anything was done with them." Variety wrote that the film "pretty much confines itself to the sicker, more offensive end of the Saturday Night Live spectrum, though with far less humorous payoff than the latter regularly delivers." Gene Siskel of the Chicago Tribune gave the film one star out of four and called the humor "sick and stupid", declaring that it was "one case in which the television network is right, and the embattled performer is wrong. Truly wrong." Linda Gross wrote that the film "feeds off television and mocks all that is middle-aged and middle-American. Its own methods are sophomoric and tacky. Rated R, it's full of bad taste, but it doesn't deliver its promised raunchiness." Gary Arnold of The Washington Post wrote, "If you think that censors are always wrong, this show could change your mind. O'Donoghue doesn't give offense by being obscenely funny. He gives offense by being obscenely pointless, tasteless and mean."

Bruce Blackadar of the Toronto Star said that "the truth is that not only is Mondo Video a prime candidate for worst movie of the year, it's also bad television and it deserved to be censored because it's stupid beyond redemption, joylessly repugnant, a rip-off of the first magnitude. It's also the most boring unstructured and unintelligently produced effort ever by the Saturday Night group. But the worst crime of all is that Mondo Video has only enough truly funny moments to fill up the time it takes to sell a second-rate detergent in a television commercial." Michael Clark of the Detroit Free Press wrote that the film "hit town just one day after the merciful departure of Sammy Stops the World, another theatrically exhibited non-movie whose box-office performance will no doubt have theater owners all over the country pillaging their children's college funds to come up with this month's mortgage payment. Mike may do marginally better than Sammy, but most viewers will probably agree with the NBC censors who took one look at this slapdash collection of jokes about Gig Young's groceries, Cheryl Tiegs' crotch, and a Cedar Rapids religious cult that worships Jack Lord as a living god and said, 'NO.'" Mitch Darden of The Indianapolis News said "it's billed as disgusting, disturbing, horrible, raunchy, gross, tasteless and if your children are falling asleep, wake them up to catch this show. That's how the movie is billed, but don't wake up the children to see this movie, it's rated 'R' for restricted—restricted to the few adults who like absurd comedy in its strangest form."

Bill Cosford of The Miami Herald wrote that "yes, it's good stuff, this Mondo. And it's sick. And it's a good thing it isn't on TV, where some unwary soul could stumble on it in the wee hours only to be traumatized. At least moviegoers will know what to expect when they walk in. You are warned." Robert Alan Rose of the St. Petersburg Times wrote that "two disappointments quickly emerge in Mr. Mike's Mondo Video, now in local theaters: Mr. Mike—alias Michael O'Donoghue—had nothing to do with writing or filming the animated antics of the clay sculpture, Mr. Bill. And—sadder to say—the rest of Mr. Mike's 90-minute offering doesn't come close to its opening segment." Greg Tozian of The Tampa Tribune said that "in Mondo Video, a 90-minute grab bag of barf-styled humor that NBC first requested be filmed and finally refused to air (deciding it was "offensive") O'Donoghue seems to miss the mark much of the time." Bob Curtright of The Wichita Beacon said simply that "the censor was right about this tasteless, offensive, sleazily-made hodge-podge." Walter V. Addiego of the San Francisco Examiner called it "a collection of outrageous skits and jokes that are long on attempted offensiveness and sadly short on humor." Ernest Leogrande of the New York Daily News said that the film "evinces a kind of smugness, a suggestion that there are clods on the earth who need to have their conventional minds jolted by ideas that the Mondo Video crowd are able to take in stride."

Roger Catlin of the Omaha World-Herald said it was "not unlike a very good episode of Saturday Night Live, which may make you feel funny about dishing out money to see it. Without shampoo commercials and other interruptions, it's almost worth it." Robert C. Trussell of The Kansas City Star wrote that it "gets two stars, not for its humor—of which there is little—but because its bizarre quality makes it an interesting novelty piece." Jacqi Tully of The Arizona Daily Star wrote:

The TV boys proved right for once. Mr. Mike's Mondo Video, shuffled out for national film distribution, is supposed to resemble a sophisticated, wittily satirical Saturday Night Live. But Mondo Video looms upon us, on the big movie screen, as an often satirical, but generally off-the-mark, comedy show.

The ads pump it up, all with the help of friends Chevy Chase ("Simply too funny for television") and Marvin Kitman ("The best comedy show of the century"), but once the show starts, it's all downhill.

Even cameo appearances by Dan [Aykroyd], Gilda [Radner] and [Laraine] Newman can't get this slapdash, schizophrenic laugher off the ground.

Why isn't it funny? I'm not sure, although seeing Buster Keaton's Steamboat Bill, Jr. the night before Mondo Video made me realize comedy requires a lucidity and crystalline vision. Keaton had it. O'Donoghue does not have it here.

Steamboat Bill, Jr. is one of the funniest movies ever made because it so beautifully communicates basic human emotions [such as] greed, loneliness, unrequited love and selflessness.

Mondo Video, as satire, should make fun of our failings or of the failings of society. Keaton creates humor by letting us in on those private feelings and less-than-ideal attitudes we can all share at times.

O'Donoghue creates humor by whacking us over the head with an idea. The laughs don't come because we're not sharing anything or learning anything.

== See also ==
- Shot-on-video film
- 1979 in television
- 1979 in film
