= Lolita =

1955 novel by Vladimir Nabokov

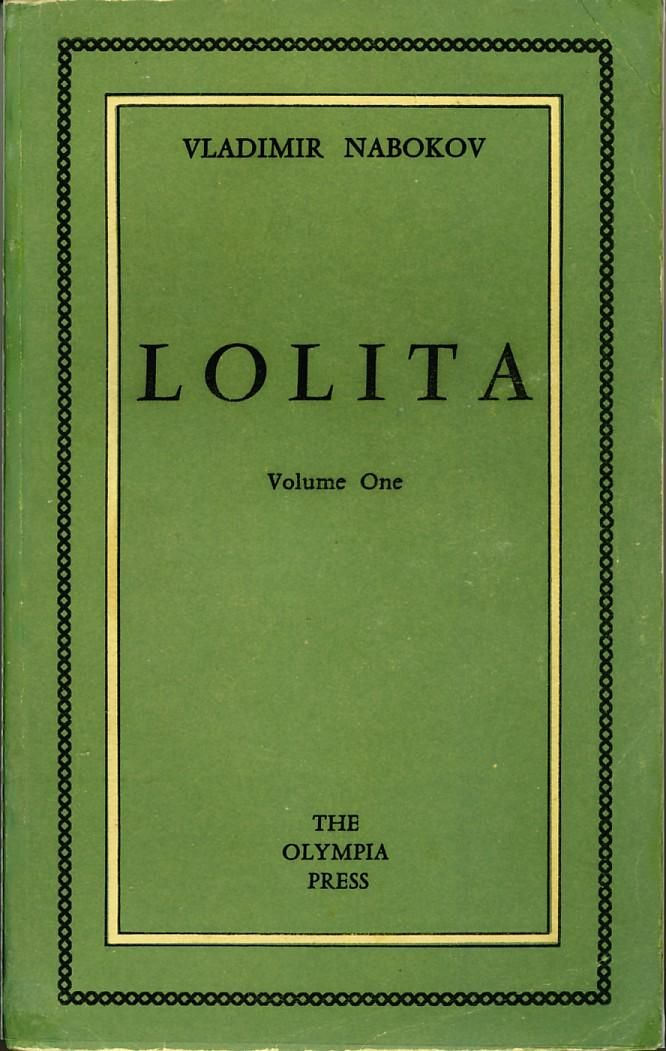
- First edition cover
- Author: Vladimir Nabokov
- Language: English
- Genre: Novel
- Publisher: Olympia Press
- Publication date: 1955
- Publication place: France
- Pages: 336

Lolita is a 1955 novel written by the Russian and American novelist Vladimir Nabokov. The protagonist and unreliable narrator is a French literature professor who moves to New England and writes under the pseudonym Humbert Humbert. He details his obsession with and victimization of a 12-year-old girl, Dolores Haze, whom he describes as a "nymphet". Humbert becomes sexually obsessed with Dolores after becoming her stepfather, and romanticizes his obsession. Privately, he calls her "Lolita", the Spanish diminutive for Dolores. The novel was written in English, but fear of censorship in the U.S. (where Nabokov lived) and Britain led to its being first published in Paris, France, in 1955 by Olympia Press.

The book has received critical acclaim in spite of the controversy it caused with the public. It has been included in many lists of best books, such as Time's List of the 100 Best Novels, Le Monde's 100 Books of the Century, Bokklubben World Library, Modern Library's 100 Best Novels, and The Big Read. The novel has been twice adapted into film: first in 1962 by Stanley Kubrick, and later in 1997 by Adrian Lyne. It has also been adapted several times for the stage.

== Plot ==
The novel is prefaced by a fictitious foreword by John Ray Jr., an editor of psychology books. Ray states that he is presenting a memoir written by a man using the pseudonym "Humbert Humbert", who had recently died of heart disease while in jail awaiting trial for an unspecified crime. The memoir, which addresses the audience as his jury, begins with Humbert's birth in Paris in 1910 to an English mother and Swiss father. He spends his childhood on the French Riviera, where he falls in love with his friend Annabel Leigh (a reference to the famous poem by Edgar Allan Poe named Annabel Lee, which treats of lost, youthful love). This youthful and physically unfulfilled love is interrupted by Annabel's premature death from typhus, which causes Humbert to become sexually obsessed with a specific type of girl, aged 9 to 14, whom he refers to as "nymphets".

After graduation, Humbert works as a teacher of French literature and begins editing an academic literary textbook, making passing references to repeated stays in mental institutions at this time. He is briefly married to a woman named Valeria before she leaves him for another man. Before the outbreak of World War II, Humbert emigrates to the United States. In 1947, he moves to Ramsdale, a small town in New England, where he can calmly continue working on his book. The house that he intends to live in is destroyed in a fire. In his search for a new home, he meets the widow Charlotte Haze, who is looking for a lodger. Humbert visits Charlotte's residence out of politeness and initially intends to decline her offer. However, Charlotte leads Humbert to her garden, where her 12-year-old daughter Dolores (also variably known as Dolly, Lo, and Lola) is sunbathing. Humbert sees in Dolores, whom he calls Lolita, the perfect nymphet and the embodiment of his first love Annabel, and quickly decides to move in.

The impassioned Humbert constantly searches for discreet forms of fulfilling his sexual urges, usually via the smallest physical contact with Dolores. When she is sent to summer camp, Humbert receives a letter from Charlotte, who confesses her love for him and gives him an ultimatum – he is to either marry her or move out immediately. Initially frightened, Humbert then begins to see the charm in the situation of being Dolores' stepfather, and so he marries Charlotte. After the wedding, Humbert experiments with drugging Charlotte with sleeping pills with the intention of later sedating both her and Dolores so that he can sexually assault the latter. But while Dolores is at summer camp, Charlotte discovers Humbert's diary, previously locked in his nightstand and deliberately written esoterically so only he could understand its meaning, albeit unsuccessfully. In the diary, she learns of his desire for her daughter and disgust for Charlotte. Shocked and disgraced, Charlotte announces her plan to flee, taking Dolores with her, having already written a number of letters to her friends warning them of Humbert. Disbelieving his false assurance that the diary is only a sketch for a future novel, Charlotte runs out of the house to send the letters, but is hit and killed by a swerving car driven by an inebriated motorist who displays his remorse by paying Charlotte's funeral expenses.

Humbert destroys the letters and retrieves Dolores from camp, claiming that her mother has fallen seriously ill and has been hospitalized. He then takes her to a high-end hotel that Charlotte had earlier recommended, where he tricks her into taking a sedative by saying it is a vitamin while having dinner downstairs. As he waits for the pill to take effect, he wanders through the hotel and meets a mysterious man who seems to be aware of Humbert's plan for Dolores. Humbert excuses himself from the conversation and returns to the hotel room. There, he discovers that he has been fobbed off with a milder drug, as Dolores is merely drowsy and wakes up frequently, drifting in and out of sleep. He dares not initiate sexual contact with her that night, though he voyeuristically broods about grasping her.

In the morning, Dolores reveals to Humbert that she engaged in sexual activity with an older boy while at camp that summer, then performs oral sex on him. After leaving the hotel, Humbert admits to Dolores that her mother is dead. In the coming days, the two travel across the country, driving all day and staying in motels and once in a bungalow, where Dolores often cries at night. Humbert desperately tries to maintain Dolores' interest in travel and himself, increasingly bribing her in exchange for sexual favors. They finally settle in Beardsley, a small New England town. Humbert adopts the role of Dolores' father and enrolls her in a local private school for girls.

Humbert jealously and strictly controls all of Dolores' social gatherings and forbids her from dating and attending parties. It is only at the instigation of the school headmaster, who regards Humbert as a strict and conservative European parent, that he agrees to Dolores' participation in the school play, the title of which is similar to the hotel in which Humbert met the mysterious man. Dolores is to play "a girl who fancies herself a nymph or fairy and pursues loves until she is pursued by a lost poet". The day before the premiere of the performance, Dolores runs out of the house following an argument with Humbert in which she claims he murdered her mother. He chases after her and finds her in a nearby drugstore drinking an ice cream soda. She then tells him she wants to leave town for another road trip. Humbert is initially delighted, but as they travel, he becomes increasingly suspicious. He feels that he is being followed by someone Dolores is familiar with.

Humbert increasingly displays signs of paranoia and mania, perhaps caused by his growing certainty that he and Dolores are being trailed by someone who wants to separate them. In the Colorado mountains, Dolores falls ill. Humbert checks her into a local hospital, from where she is discharged one night by her "uncle". Humbert knows she has no living relatives, and he immediately embarks on a frantic search to find Dolores and her abductor but initially fails. For the next two years, Humbert barely sustains himself in a moderately functional relationship with a young alcoholic named Rita.

Deeply depressed, Humbert unexpectedly receives a letter from a 17-year-old Dolores, telling him that she is married, pregnant, and in desperate need of money. Humbert, armed with a pistol, tracks down her address against her wishes. At Dolores' request, he pretends to be her estranged father and does not mention the details of their past relationship to her husband, Richard. Dolores reveals to Humbert that her abductor was the famous playwright Clare Quilty, who had crossed paths with Humbert and Dolores several times. She explains that Quilty tracked the pair with her assistance, and took her from the hospital because she was in love with him. However, he later kicked her out when she refused to star in one of his pornographic films. Humbert claims to the reader that at this moment, he realized that he was in love with Dolores all along. Humbert implores her to leave with him, but she refuses. Accepting her decision, Humbert gives her the money she is owed from her inheritance. Humbert then goes to the drug-addled Quilty's mansion and shoots him dead.

Shortly afterward, Humbert is arrested, and in his closing thoughts, he reaffirms his love for Dolores and asks for his memoir to be withheld from public release until after her death. The deaths of Humbert (shortly after his imprisonment) and Dolores (in childbirth on Christmas Day 1952) have already been related in the foreword.

== Erotic motifs and controversy ==
Lolita is frequently described as an "erotic novel", not only by some critics but also in a standard reference work on literature, Facts on File: Companion to the American Short Story. The Great Soviet Encyclopedia called Lolita "an experiment in combining an erotic novel with an instructive novel of manners". The same description of the novel is found in Desmond Morris's reference work The Book of Ages. A survey of books for women's studies courses describes it as a "tongue-in-cheek erotic novel". Books focused on the history of erotic literature such as Michael Perkins' The Secret Record: Modern Erotic Literature also so classify Lolita. More cautious classifications have included a "novel with erotic motifs", or one of "a number of works of classical erotic literature and art, and to novels that contain elements of eroticism, such as Ulysses and Lady Chatterley's Lover."

This classification has been disputed. Malcolm Bradbury writes that "at first famous as an erotic novel, Lolita soon won its way as a literary one—a late modernist distillation of the whole crucial mythology." Samuel Schuman says that Nabokov "is a surrealist, linked to Gogol, Dostoevsky, and Kafka. Lolita is characterized by irony and sarcasm; it is not an erotic novel." Lance Olsen writes: "The first 13 chapters of the text, culminating with the oft-cited scene of Lo unwittingly stretching her legs across Humbert's excited lap ... are the only chapters suggestive of the erotic." Nabokov himself observes in the novel's afterword that a few readers were "misled [by the opening of the book] ... into assuming this was going to be a lewd book ... [expecting] the rising succession of erotic scenes; when these stopped, the readers stopped, too, and felt bored."

== Style and interpretation ==
The novel is narrated by Humbert, who riddles the narrative with word play and his wry observations of American culture. The novel's flamboyant style is characterized by double entendres, multilingual puns, anagrams, and coinages such as nymphet, a word that has since had a life of its own and can be found in most dictionaries, and the lesser-used "faunlet". For Richard Rorty, in his interpretation of Lolita in Contingency, Irony, and Solidarity, Humbert is a "monster of incuriosity", dramatizing "the particular form of cruelty about which Nabokov worried most – incuriosity" in that he is "exquisitely sensitive to everything which affects or provides expression for his own obsession, and entirely incurious about anything that affects anyone else."

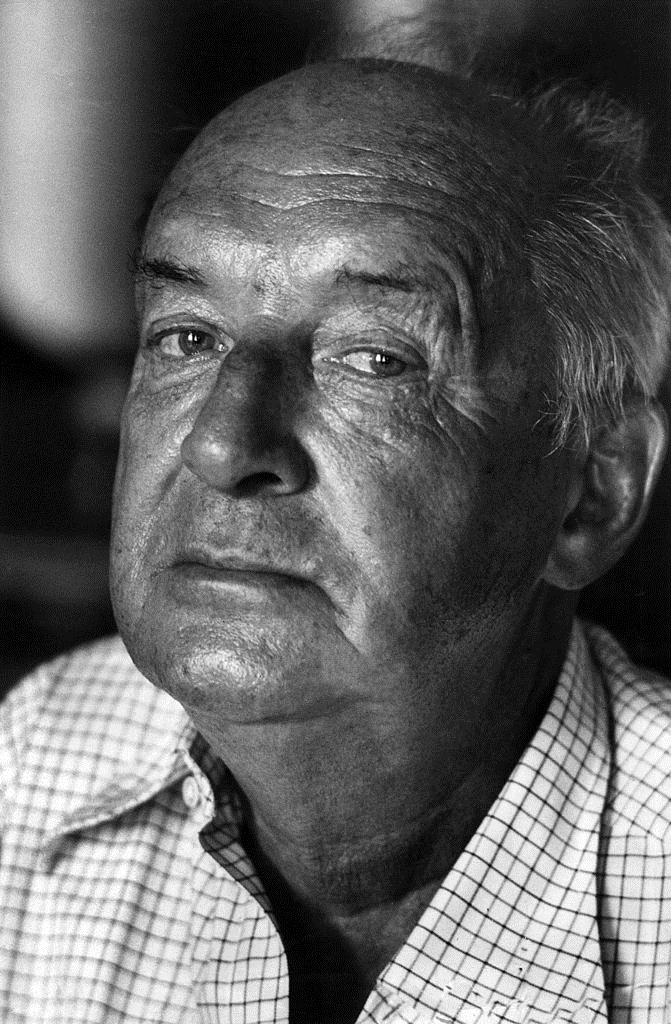
Vladimir Nabokov

Nabokov, who famously decried social satire, novels with direct political messages, and those he considered "moralists", avoided providing any overt interpretations to his work. However, when prompted in a 1967 interview with: "Your sense of the immorality of the relationship between Humbert Humbert and Lolita is very strong. In Hollywood and New York, however, relationships are frequent between men of forty and girls very little older than Lolita. They marry—to no particular public outrage; rather, public cooing", he replied:

No, it is not my sense of the immorality of the Humbert Humbert–Lolita relationship that is strong; it is Humbert's sense. He cares, I do not. I do not give a damn for public morals, in America or elsewhere. And, anyway, cases of men in their forties marrying girls in their teens or early twenties have no bearing on Lolita. Humbert was fond of "little girls"—not simply "young girls". Nymphets are girl-children, not starlets and "sex kittens". Lolita was twelve, not eighteen, when Humbert met her. You may remember that by the time she is fourteen, he refers to her as his "aging mistress".

Nabokov described Humbert as "a vain and cruel wretch who manages to appear 'touching'" later in the same interview. When asked about coming up with Humbert's doubled name, he described it as "... a hateful name for a hateful person. It is also a kingly name, and I did need a royal vibration for Humbert the Fierce and Humbert the Humble."

Critics have further noted that, since the novel is a first person narrative by Humbert, the novel gives very little information about what Lolita is like as a person, that in effect she has been silenced by not being the book's narrator. Nomi Tamir-Ghez writes: "Not only is Lolita's voice silenced, her point of view, the way she sees the situation and feels about it, is rarely mentioned and can be only surmised by the reader ... since it is Humbert who tells the story ... throughout most of the novel, the reader is absorbed in Humbert's feelings." Similarly Mica Howe and Sarah Appleton Aguiar write that the novel silences and objectifies Lolita. Christine Clegg notes that this is a recurring theme in criticism of the novel in the 1990s. Actor Brian Cox, who played Humbert in a 2009 one-man stage monologue based on the novel, stated that the novel is "not about Lolita as a flesh and blood entity. It's Lolita as a memory." He concluded that a stage monologue would be truer to the book than any film could possibly be. Elizabeth Janeway, writing in The New York Times Book Review, holds: "Humbert is every man who is driven by desire, wanting his Lolita so badly that it never occurs to him to consider her as a human being, or as anything but a dream-figment made flesh."

Clegg sees the novel's non-disclosure of Lolita's feelings as directly linked to the fact that her real name is Dolores and only Humbert refers to her as Lolita. Humbert also states he has effectively "solipsized" Lolita early in the novel. Eric Lemay writes:

The human child, the one noticed by non-nymphomaniacs, answers to other names, "Lo", "Lola", "Dolly", and, least alluring of all, "Dolores". "But in my arms," asserts Humbert, "she was always Lolita." And in his arms or out, "Lolita" was always the creation of Humbert's craven self ... The Siren-like Humbert sings a song of himself, to himself, and titles that self and that song "Lolita". ... To transform Dolores into Lolita, to seal this sad adolescent within his musky self, Humbert must deny her her humanity.

In 2003, Iranian expatriate Azar Nafisi published the memoir Reading Lolita in Tehran about a covert women's reading group. In an NPR interview, Nafisi contrasts the sorrowful and seductive sides of Dolores/Lolita's character. She notes: "Because her name is not Lolita, her real name is Dolores which, as you know, in Latin means dolour, so her real name is associated with sorrow and with anguish and with innocence, while Lolita becomes a sort of light-headed, seductive, and airy name. The Lolita of our novel is both of these at the same time and in our culture here today we only associate it with one aspect of that little girl and the crassest interpretation of her." Following Nafisi's comments, the NPR interviewer, Madeleine Brand, lists as embodiments of the latter side of Lolita "the Long Island Lolita, Britney Spears, the Olsen twins, and Sue Lyon in Stanley Kubrick's Lolita."

For Nafisi, the essence of the novel is Humbert's solipsism and his erasure of Lolita's independent identity. She writes: "Lolita was given to us as Humbert's creature ... To reinvent her, Humbert must take from Lolita her own real history and replace it with his own ... Yet she does have a past. Despite Humbert's attempts to orphan Lolita by robbing her of her history, that past is still given to us in glimpses."

One of the novel's early champions, Lionel Trilling, warned in 1958 of the moral difficulty in interpreting a book with so eloquent and so self-deceived a narrator: "we find ourselves the more shocked when we realize that, in the course of reading the novel, we have come virtually to condone the violation it presents ... we have been seduced into conniving in the violation, because we have permitted our fantasies to accept what we know to be revolting."

In 1958, Dorothy Parker described the novel as "the engrossing, anguished story of a man, a man of taste and culture, who can love only little girls" and Lolita as "a dreadful little creature, selfish, hard, vulgar, and foul-tempered". In 1959, novelist Robertson Davies wrote that the theme of Lolita is "not the corruption of an innocent child by a cunning adult, but the exploitation of a weak adult by a corrupt child. This is no pretty theme, but it is one with which social workers, magistrates and psychiatrists are familiar."

External videos
- "Lolita and American Morality", 10 February 1998, presentation by Martin Amis at the New York Public Library, C-SPAN

In his essay on Stalinism Koba the Dread, Martin Amis proposes that Lolita is an elaborate metaphor for the totalitarianism that destroyed the Russia of Nabokov's childhood (though Nabokov states in his afterword that he "[detests] symbols and allegories"). Amis interprets it as a story of tyranny told from the point of view of the tyrant. "Nabokov, in all his fiction, writes with incomparable penetration about delusion and coercion, about cruelty and lies," he says. "Even Lolita, especially Lolita, is a study in tyranny."

The term "Lolita" has been assimilated into popular culture as a description of a young girl who is "precociously seductive ... without connotations of victimization". In Japan, the novel gave rise in the early 1980s to lolicon, a genre of fictional media in which young (or young-looking) girl characters appear in romantic or sexual contexts.

=== Unreliable narration ===
Literary critics and commentators almost universally regard Humbert as an unreliable narrator, although the nature of his unreliability is a matter of debate. The literary critic Wayne C. Booth coined the term "unreliable narrator" to describe a narrator whose ethical norms differ from those of the implied author. While Booth's definition has served as the basis for most subsequent narratological analysis, some commentators have disregarded his definition to classify Humbert as unreliable based on the dishonesty of his character and motives.

Booth places Humbert in a literary tradition of unreliable narrators that is "full of traps for the unsuspecting reader, some of them not particularly harmful but some of them crippling or even fatal". Booth cites Trilling's inability to decide whether or not Humbert's final indictment of his own morality is to be taken seriously, and Trilling's conclusion that "this ambiguity made the novel better, not worse" in its "ability to arouse uneasiness," as evidence of irony's literary triumph over "clarity and simplicity". For Booth, one of Lolita's main appeals is "watching Humbert almost make a case for himself" as Nabokov gives him "full and unlimited control of the rhetorical resources". Booth trusts that "skilful and mature" readers will repudiate "Humbert's blandishments", picking up on Nabokov's ironies, clues and "dead giveaway" style, but many readers "will identify Humbert with the author more than Nabokov intends", unable to dissociate themselves "from a vicious center of consciousness presented ... with all of the seductive self-justification of skilful rhetoric".

Literary scholar James Phelan notes that Booth's commentary on Lolita served as a "flashpoint" for resistance from readers of the New Criticism school to Booth's conception of fiction as rhetorical action. (Note: Booth conceived of fiction as a rhetorical relation between author and reader; he viewed "fictional narratives not as autonomous objects but as acts of communication whose aesthetic qualities were intertwined with their ethical effects on individual readers".) Booth acknowledges that Nabokov marks Humbert as unreliable while also complaining about Lolita's morality; he considers the novel "delightful" and "profound", while also condemning Humbert's actions in violating Lolita. Phelan addresses this problem of the relation between technique and ethics in Lolita by attempting to account for "two especially notable groups of readers": "those who are taken in by Humbert's artful narration" and those who resist "all of his rhetorical appeals". Phelan theorizes that accounting for these two audiences will also account for the relations between two groups often separated by rhetorical theory, the "authorial audience" (the hypothetical readers for whom the author writes and who ground the author's rhetorical choices) and the "flesh and blood readers" (the people actually reading the book).

Phelan distinguishes two techniques of unreliable narration – "estranging unreliability", which increases the distance between narrator and audience, and "bonding unreliability", which reduces the distance between narrator and audience – and argues that Nabokov employs both types of unreliability, and "a coding in which he gives the narration many marks of bonding unreliability but ultimately marks it as estranging unreliability". In this way, Nabokov persuades the authorial audience towards Humbert before estranging them from him. Phelan concludes that this process results in two misreadings of the novel: many readers will be taken in by Humbert's narration, missing the marks of estranging unreliability or detecting only some of the narrator's tricks, while other readers, in decoding the estranging unreliability, will conclude that all of Humbert's narration is unreliable.

William Riggan places Humbert in a tradition of unreliable narration embodied by the fool or clown, in particular the disguised insight of the wise fool and the ironies, variations and ambiguities of the sotie. For Riggan, Humbert's imprisonment in art and solipsism makes his account a parodic burlesque of confessional writing that suspends the possibility of a realistic fiction in which Humbert's point of view is credible. While superficially allied in his artistic aims with Nabokov's "espousal of esthetic bliss as the foremost criterion in the novel," Humbert separates himself with his contradictory depictions of himself and Lolita as literary constructs. Humbert depicts himself as "alternately monstrous, buffoonish ... witty, brutish, tender, malevolent, and kind". He self-consciously casts himself in the buffoonish role of "a combination of urbane satirist, brutish satyr, and sadly gleeful Harlequin". He both caricatures Lolita as commonplace and idealizes her into a solipsized vision entirely different from the real Lolita. Riggan sees Humbert as personifying "the spirit of Harlequin or a sottie clown who annihilates reality, turns life into a game and the world upside down, and ends by creating chaos".

Some critics point to chronological discrepancies in Lolita as intentional and "centrally relevant" to Humbert's unreliable narration. Christina Tekiner views the discrepancies as evidence that the last nine chapters of the novel are a product of Humbert's imagination, and Leona Toker believes that the "crafty handling of dates" exposes Humbert's "cognitive unreliability". Other critics, such as Brian Boyd, explain the discrepancies as Nabokov's errors.

== Publication and reception ==
Nabokov finished Lolita on 6 December 1953, five years after starting it. Because of its subject matter, Nabokov intended to publish it pseudonymously (although the anagrammatic character Vivian Darkbloom would tip off the alert reader). The manuscript was turned down, with more or less regret, by Viking, Simon & Schuster, New Directions, Farrar, Straus, and Doubleday. After these refusals and warnings, he finally resorted to publication in France. Via his translator Doussia Ergaz, it reached Maurice Girodias of Olympia Press, "three-quarters of [whose] list was pornographic trash". Underinformed about Olympia, overlooking hints of Girodias's approval of the conduct of a protagonist Girodias presumed was based on the author, and despite warnings from Morris Bishop, his friend at Cornell, Nabokov signed a contract with Olympia Press for publication of the book, to come out under his own name.

Lolita was published in September 1955, as a pair of green paperbacks "swarming with typographical errors". Although the first printing of 5,000 copies sold out, there were no substantial reviews. Eventually, at the very end of 1955, Graham Greene, in the London Sunday Times, called it one of the three best books of 1955. This statement provoked a response from the London Sunday Express, whose editor John Gordon called it "the filthiest book I have ever read" and "sheer unrestrained pornography". British Customs officers were then instructed by the Home Office to seize all copies entering the United Kingdom. In December 1956, France followed suit, and the Minister of the Interior banned Lolita; the ban lasted for two years. Its eventual British publication by Weidenfeld & Nicolson in London in 1959 was controversial enough to contribute to the end of the political career of the Conservative member of parliament Nigel Nicolson, one of the company's partners.

The novel then appeared in Danish and Dutch translations. Two editions of a Swedish translation were withdrawn at the author's request.

Despite initial trepidation, there was no official response in the U.S., and the first American edition was issued by G. P. Putnam's Sons in August 1958. The book was into a third printing within days and became the first since Gone with the Wind to sell 100,000 copies in its first three weeks. A month after publication in the U.S. the Cincinnati Public Library banned the book for "the theme of perversion." Orville Prescott, the influential book reviewer of the New York Times, greatly disliked the book, describing it as "dull, dull, dull in a pretentious, florid and archly fatuous fashion". This review failed to influence the book's sales and it is estimated that Lolita had sold 50 million copies by 2005.

Lolita was later translated into Russian by Nabokov himself and published in New York City in 1967 by Phaedra Publishers. The Russian Lolita contains Nabokov’s only known published instance of poetry self-translated from English into Russian.

=== Present-day views ===
The novel continues to generate controversy today as modern society has become increasingly aware of the lasting damage created by child sexual abuse. In 2008, an entire book, Approaches to Teaching Nabokov's Lolita, was published on the best ways to teach the novel in a college classroom given that "its particular mix of narrative strategies, ornate allusive prose, and troublesome subject matter complicates its presentation to students".

Many critics describe Humbert as a rapist, notably Azar Nafisi in her best-selling Reading Lolita in Tehran, though in a survey of critics Elizabeth Patnoe notes that other interpreters of the novel have been reluctant to use that term, despite Patnoe's observation that Humbert's actions "can only be interpreted as rape". Patnoe finds that many critics "sympathetically incorporate Humbert's language into their own", or believe Lolita seduces Humbert while emphasizing Humbert's responsibility. Of those who claim that Humbert rapes Lolita, Patnoe finds that many "go on to subvert the claim by confounding love and rape".

Near the end of the novel, Humbert states that had he been his own sentencing judge, he "would have given Humbert at least thirty-five years for rape". Nabokov biographer Brian Boyd denies that it was rape "in any ordinary sense", on the grounds that "it is she who suggests that they try out the naughty trick" which she has already learned at summer camp. This perspective is vigorously disputed by Peter Rabinowitz in his essay "Lolita: Solipsized or Sodomized?" Rabinowitz argues that in seeking metaphorical readings and generalized meaning, academic readers viewing Lolita within the frame of high art are "standing back from the situation — a posture that leads, in this case, to a blame-the-victim reading by turning this victimized child into a femme fatale, a cruel mistress, a girl without emotions."

In 2015, Joanne Harris wrote for The Independent about the enduring controversy and fascination with Lolita, saying: "This novel, so often condemned as obscene, contains not a single explicit phrase, but instead radiates colour and sensuality throughout, spinning the straw of obscenity into the gold of rapture. Perhaps this is the real reason for the outrage that greeted its publication. Paedophilia is not a subject that should be linked with poetry."

In 2020, a podcast hosted by Jamie Loftus set out to examine the cultural legacy of the novel, and argued that depictions and adaptations have "twisted" Nabokov's original intention of condemning Humbert in Lolita.

Besides the United Kingdom and France, Lolita had been banned in Argentina, Austria, Australia, Belgium, Myanmar, and parts of the United States. In October 2023 the Canby School District in Oregon banned Lolita from its schools. In November 2023 the Catawba County Schools Board of Education in North Carolina restricted access to Lolita, requiring students to obtain a parent's permission to access the book.

== Sources and links ==
=== Links in Nabokov's work ===
In 1928, Nabokov wrote a poem named "Lilith" (Лилит), which depicts an adult man engaging in sexual acts with a child whom he is sexually attracted to, before she pushes him off, leaving him feeling humiliated. In 1939, he wrote a novella, Volshebnik (Волшебник), that was published only posthumously in 1986 in English translation as The Enchanter. It bears many similarities to Lolita, but also has significant differences: it takes place in Central Europe, and the protagonist is unable to consummate his passion with his stepdaughter, leading to his suicide. The theme of hebephilia was already touched on by Nabokov in his short story "A Nursery Tale", written in 1926. Also, in the 1932 novel Laughter in the Dark, Margot Peters is 16 and has already had an affair when the middle-aged Albinus becomes attracted to her.

In chapter three of the novel The Gift (written in Russian in 1935–37), the similar gist of Lolita's first chapter is outlined to the protagonist, Fyodor Cherdyntsev, by his landlord Shchyogolev as an idea of a novel he would write "if I only had the time": a man marries a widow only to gain access to her young daughter, who resists all his passes. Shchyogolev says it happened "in reality" to a friend of his; it is made clear to the reader that it concerns himself and his stepdaughter Zina (15 at the time of Shchyogolev's marriage to her mother), who becomes the love of Fyodor's life.

In April 1947, Nabokov wrote to Edmund Wilson: "I am writing ... a short novel about a man who liked little girls—and it's going to be called The Kingdom by the Sea." The work expanded into Lolita during the next eight years. Nabokov used the title A Kingdom by the Sea in his 1974 pseudo-autobiographical novel Look at the Harlequins! for a Lolita-like book written by the narrator who, in addition, travels with his teenage daughter Bel from motel to motel after the death of her mother; later, his fourth wife is Bel's look-alike and shares her birthday.

In Nabokov's 1962 novel Pale Fire, the titular poem by fictional John Shade mentions Hurricane Lolita coming up the American east coast in 1958, and narrator Charles Kinbote (in the commentary later in the book) notes it, questioning why anyone would have chosen an obscure Spanish nickname for a hurricane. There were no hurricanes named Lolita that year, but that is the year that Lolita was published in North America.

The unfinished novel The Original of Laura, published posthumously, features the character Hubert H. Hubert, an older man preying upon the then-child protagonist, Flora. Unlike those of Humbert Humbert in Lolita, Hubert's advances are unsuccessful.

=== Literary pastiches, allusions and prototypes ===
The novel abounds in allusions to classical and modern literature. Virtually all of them have been noted in The Annotated Lolita, edited and annotated by Alfred Appel Jr. Many are references to Humbert's own favorite poet, Edgar Allan Poe.

Humbert's first love, Annabel Leigh, is named after the "maiden" in the poem "Annabel Lee" by Poe; this poem is alluded to many times in the novel, and its lines are borrowed to describe Humbert's love. A passage in chapter 11 reuses verbatim Poe's phrase "...by the side of my darling—my darling—my life and my bride". In the opening of the novel, the phrase "Ladies and gentlemen of the jury, exhibit number one is what the seraphs, the misinformed, simple, noble-winged seraphs, envied," is a pastiche of two passages of the poem, the "winged seraphs of heaven" (line 11), and "The angels, not half so happy in heaven, went envying her and me" (lines 21–22). Nabokov originally intended Lolita to be called The Kingdom by the Sea, drawing on the rhyme with Annabel Lee that was used in the first verse of Poe's work. A variant of this line is reprised in the opening of chapter one, which reads "...had I not loved, one summer, an initial girl-child. In a princedom by the sea".

Humbert Humbert's double name recalls Poe's "William Wilson", a tale in which the main character is haunted by his doppelgänger, paralleling the presence of Humbert's own doppelgänger, Clare Quilty. Humbert is not, however, his real name, but a chosen pseudonym. The theme of the doppelgänger also occurs in Nabokov's earlier novel, Despair.

Chapter 26 of Part One contains a parody of Joyce's stream of consciousness.

Humbert's field of expertise is French literature (one of his jobs is writing a series of educational works that compare French writers to English writers), and as such there are several references to French literature, including the authors Gustave Flaubert, Marcel Proust, François Rabelais, Charles Baudelaire, Prosper Mérimée, Rémy Belleau, Honoré de Balzac, and Pierre de Ronsard.

Nabokov was fond of the works of Lewis Carroll, and had translated Alice in Wonderland into Russian. He even called Carroll the "first Humbert Humbert". Lolita contains a few brief allusions in the text to the Alice books, though overall Nabokov avoided direct allusions to Carroll. In her book, Tramp: The Life of Charlie Chaplin, Joyce Milton says that a major inspiration for the novel was Charlie Chaplin's relationship with his second wife, Lita Grey, whose real name was Lillita and is often misstated as Lolita. Graham Vickers in his book Chasing Lolita: How Popular Culture Corrupted Nabokov's Little Girl All Over Again argues that the two major real-world predecessors of Humbert are Lewis Carroll and Charlie Chaplin. Although Appel's comprehensive Annotated Lolita contains no references to Charlie Chaplin, others have picked up several oblique references to Chaplin's life in Nabokov's book. Bill Delaney notes that at the end Lolita and her husband move to the fictional Alaskan town of "Gray Star" while Chaplin's The Gold Rush, set in Alaska, was originally set to star Lita Grey. Lolita's first sexual encounter was with a boy named Charlie Holmes, whom Humbert describes as "the silent ... but indefatigable Charlie". Chaplin had an artist paint Lita Grey in imitation of Joshua Reynolds's painting The Age of Innocence. When Humbert visits Lolita in a class at her school, he notes a print of the same painting in the classroom. Delaney's article notes many other parallels as well.

The foreword refers to "the monumental decision rendered December 6, 1933 by Hon. John M. Woolsey in regard to another, considerably more outspoken book"—that is, the decision in the case United States v. One Book Called Ulysses, in which Woolsey ruled that Joyce's Ulysses was not obscene and could be sold in the United States.

In chapter 29 of Part Two, Humbert comments that Lolita looks "like Botticelli's russet Venus—the same soft nose, the same blurred beauty," referencing Sandro Botticelli's depiction of Venus in, perhaps, The Birth of Venus or Venus and Mars.

In chapter 35 of Part Two, Humbert's "death sentence" on Quilty parodies the rhythm and use of anaphora in T. S. Eliot's poem Ash Wednesday.

Many other references to classical and Romantic literature abound, including references to Lord Byron's Childe Harold's Pilgrimage and to the poetry of Laurence Sterne.

=== Other possible real-life prototypes ===
In addition to the possible prototypes of Lewis Carroll and Charlie Chaplin, Alexander Dolinin suggests that the prototype of Lolita was 11-year-old Florence Horner, kidnapped in 1948 by 50-year-old mechanic Frank La Salle, who had caught her stealing a five-cent notebook. La Salle traveled with her over various states for 21 months and is believed to have raped her. He claimed that he was an FBI agent and threatened to "turn her in" for the theft and to send her to "a place for girls like you". The Horner case was not widely reported, but Dolinin notes various similarities in events and descriptions.

While Nabokov had already used the same basic idea—that of a child molester and his victim booking into a hotel as father and daughter—in his then-unpublished 1939 work The Enchanter (Волшебник), he mentions the Horner case explicitly in Chapter 33 of Part II of Lolita: "Had I done to Dolly, perhaps, what Frank Lasalle, a fifty-year-old mechanic, had done to eleven-year-old Sally Horner in 1948?"

=== Heinz von Lichberg's "Lolita" ===
German academic Michael Maar's book The Two Lolitas describes his discovery of a 1916 German short story titled "Lolita" whose middle-aged narrator describes travelling abroad as a student. He takes a room as a lodger and instantly becomes obsessed with the preteen girl (also named Lolita) who lives in the same house. Maar has speculated that Nabokov may have had cryptomnesia ("hidden memory") while he was composing Lolita during the 1950s. Maar says that until 1937 Nabokov lived in the same section of Berlin as the author, Heinz von Eschwege (pen name: Heinz von Lichberg), and was most likely familiar with his work, which was widely available in Germany during Nabokov's time there. The Philadelphia Inquirer, in the article "Lolita at 50: Did Nabokov take literary liberties?" says that, according to Maar, accusations of plagiarism should not apply and quotes him as saying: "Literature has always been a huge crucible in which familiar themes are continually recast... Nothing of what we admire in Lolita is already to be found in the tale; the former is in no way deducible from the latter." See also Jonathan Lethem's essay "The Ecstasy of Influence: A Plagiarism" in Harper's Magazine on this story.

== Nabokov on Lolita ==
=== Afterword ===
In 1956, Nabokov wrote an afterword to Lolita ("On a Book Entitled Lolita") that first appeared in the first U.S. edition and has appeared thereafter.

I am neither a reader nor a writer of didactic fiction, and, despite John Ray’s assertion, Lolita has no moral in tow. For me a work of fiction exists only insofar as it affords me what I shall bluntly call aesthetic bliss, that is a sense of being somehow, somewhere, connected with other states of being where art (curiosity, tenderness, kindness, ecstasy) is the norm.

One of the first things Nabokov makes a point of saying is that, despite John Ray Jr.'s claim in the foreword, there is no moral to the story.

Nabokov adds that "the initial shiver of inspiration [for Lolita] was somehow prompted by a newspaper story about an ape in the Jardin des plantes who, after months of coaxing by a scientist, produced the first drawing ever charcoaled by an animal: this sketch showed the bars of the poor creature's cage." Neither the article nor the drawing has been recovered.

In response to an American critic who characterized Lolita as the record of Nabokov's "love affair with the romantic novel", Nabokov writes that "the substitution of 'English language' for 'romantic novel' would make this elegant formula more correct."

Nabokov concludes the afterword with a reference to his beloved first language, which he abandoned as a writer once he moved to the United States in 1940: "My private tragedy, which cannot, and indeed should not, be anybody's concern, is that I had to abandon my natural idiom, my untrammeled, rich, and infinitely docile Russian language for a second-rate brand of English."

=== Estimation ===
Nabokov rated the book highly. In an interview for BBC Television in 1962, he said:

Lolita is a special favorite of mine. It was my most difficult book—the book that treated of a theme which was so distant, so remote, from my own emotional life that it gave me a special pleasure to use my combinational talent to make it real.

Over a year later, in an interview for Playboy, he said:

No, I shall never regret Lolita. She was like the composition of a beautiful puzzle—its composition and its solution at the same time, since one is a mirror view of the other, depending on the way you look. Of course she completely eclipsed my other works—at least those I wrote in English: The Real Life of Sebastian Knight, Bend Sinister, my short stories, my book of recollections; but I cannot grudge her this. There is a queer, tender charm about that mythical nymphet.

In the same year, in an interview with Life, Nabokov was asked which of his writings had most pleased him. He answered:

I would say that of all my books Lolita has left me with the most pleasurable afterglow—perhaps because it is the purest of all, the most abstract and carefully contrived. I am probably responsible for the odd fact that people don't seem to name their daughters Lolita any more. I have heard of young female poodles being given that name since 1956, but of no human beings.

=== Russian translation ===
The Russian translation includes a "Postscriptum" in which Nabokov reconsiders his relationship with his native language. Referring to the afterword in the English edition, Nabokov states that only "the scientific scrupulousness led me to preserve the last paragraph of the American afterword in the Russian text..." He further explains that the "story of this translation is the story of a disappointment. Alas, that 'wonderful Russian language' which, I imagined, still awaits me somewhere, which blooms like a faithful spring behind the locked gate to which I, after so many years, still possess the key, turned out to be non-existent, and there is nothing beyond that gate, except for some burned out stumps and hopeless autumnal emptiness, and the key in my hand looks rather like a lock pick."

== Adaptations ==
Lolita has been adapted as two films, a musical, four stage-plays, one completed opera, and two ballets. There is also Nabokov's unfilmed (and re-edited) screenplay, an uncompleted opera based on the work, and an "imagined opera" which combines elements of opera and dance.

- Film: Lolita was made in 1962 by Stanley Kubrick, and starred James Mason, Shelley Winters, Peter Sellers and Sue Lyon as Lolita; Nabokov was nominated for an Academy Award for his work on this film's adapted screenplay, although little of this work reached the screen; Stanley Kubrick and James Harris substantially rewrote Nabokov's script, though neither took credit. The film greatly expands the character of Clare Quilty, Lolita's age is raised to 14, and there are no references to Humbert's obsession with young girls before meeting Dolores. Veteran arranger Nelson Riddle composed the music for the film, whose soundtrack includes the hit single, "Lolita Ya Ya".
- Musical: The book was adapted into a musical in 1971 by Alan Jay Lerner and John Barry under the title Lolita, My Love. Critics praised the play for sensitively translating the story to the stage, but it nonetheless closed before it opened in New York. The show was revived in a Musicals in Mufti production at the York Theatre in New York in March 2019 as adapted from several of Lerner's drafts by Erik Haagensen and a score recovered and directed by Deniz Cordell.
- Screenplay: Nabokov's own re-edited and condensed version of the screenplay (revised December 1973) he originally submitted for Kubrick's film (before its extensive rewrite by Kubrick and Harris) was published by McGraw-Hill in 1974. One new element is that Quilty's play The Hunted Enchanter, staged at Dolores' high school, contains a scene that is an exact duplicate of a painting in the front lobby of the hotel, The Enchanted Hunters, at which Humbert begins a sexual relationship with Lolita.
- Play: In 1981 Edward Albee adapted the book into a play, Lolita, with Nabokov (renamed "A Certain Gentleman" after a threatened lawsuit) onstage as a narrator. The troubled production was a fiasco and was savaged by Albee as well as the critics, Frank Rich even predicting fatal damage to Albee's career. Rich noted that the play's reading of the character of Quilty seemed to be taken from the Kubrick film.
- Opera: In 1992 Russian composer Rodion Shchedrin adapted Lolita into a Russian-language opera Lolita, which premiered in Swedish in 1994 at the Royal Swedish Opera. The first performance in Russian was in Moscow in 2004. The opera was nominated for Russia's Golden Mask award. Its first performance in German was on 30 April at the Hessisches Staatstheater Wiesbaden as the opening night of the Internationale Maifestspiele Wiesbaden in 2011. The German version was shortened from four hours to three, but noted Lolita's death at the conclusion, which had been omitted from the earlier longer version. It was considered well-staged but musically monotonous. In 2001, Shchedrin extracted "symphonic fragments" for orchestra from the opera score, which were published as Lolita-Serenade.
- Film: The 1997 film Lolita was directed by Adrian Lyne, starring Jeremy Irons, Dominique Swain, Melanie Griffith, and Frank Langella.
- Opera: In 1999, the Boston-based composer John Harbison began an opera of Lolita, which he abandoned in the wake of the clergy child abuse scandal in Boston. He abandoned it by 2005, but fragments were woven into a seven-minute piece, "Darkbloom: Overture for an Imagined Opera". Vivian Darkbloom, an anagram of Vladimir Nabokov, is a character in Lolita.
- Play: In 2003, Russian director Victor Sobchak wrote a second non-musical stage adaptation, which played at the Lion and Unicorn fringe theater in London. It drops the character of Quilty and updates the story to modern England, and includes long passages of Nabokov's prose in voiceover.
- Play: Also in 2003, a stage adaptation of Nabokov's unused screenplay was performed in Dublin adapted by Michael West. It was described by Karina Buckley (in the Sunday Times of London) as playing more like Italian commedia dell'arte than a dark drama about pedophilia. Hiroko Mikami notes that the initial sexual encounter between Lolita and Humbert was staged in a way that left this adaptation particularly open to the charge of placing the blame for initiating the relationship on Lolita and normalizing child sexual abuse. Mikami challenged this reading of the production, noting that the ultimate devastation of events on Lolita's life is duly noted in the play.
- Ballet: In 2003, Italian choreographer Davide Bombana created a ballet based on Lolita that ran 70 minutes. It used music by Dmitri Shostakovich, György Ligeti, Alfred Schnittke and Salvatore Sciarrino. It was performed by the Grand Ballet de Genève in Switzerland in November 2003. It earned him the award Premio Danza E Danza in 2004 as "Best Italian Choreographer Abroad".
- Opera: American composer Joshua Fineberg and choreographer Johanne Saunier created an "imagined opera" of Lolita. Running 70 minutes, it premiered in Montclair, New Jersey in April 2009. While other characters silently dance, Humbert narrates, often with his back to the audience as his image is projected onto video screens. Writing in The New York Times, Steve Smith noted that it stressed Humbert as a moral monster and madman, rather than as a suave seducer, and that it does nothing to "suggest sympathy" on any level of Humbert. Smith also described it as "less an opera in any conventional sense than a multimedia monodrama". The composer described Humbert as "deeply seductive but deeply evil". He expressed his desire to ignore the plot and the novel's elements of parody, and instead to put the audience "in the mind of a madman". He regarded himself as duplicating Nabokov's effect of putting something on the surface and undermining it, an effect for which he thought music was especially suited.
- Play: In 2009 Richard Nelson created a one-man drama, the only character onstage being Humbert speaking from his jail cell. It premiered in London with Brian Cox as Humbert. Cox believes that this is truer to the spirit of the book than other stage or film adaptations, since the story is not about Lolita herself but about Humbert's flawed memories of her.
- Play: Four Humors created and staged a Minnesota Fringe Festival version called Four Humors Lolita: a Three-Man Show, August 2013. The show was billed as "A one hour stage play, based on the two and a half hour movie by Stanley Kubrick, based on the 5 hour screenplay by Vladimir Nabokov, based on the 300 page novel by Vladimir Nabokov, as told by 3 idiots."

=== Derivative literary works ===
- The Italian novelist and scholar Umberto Eco published a short parody of Nabokov's novel called "Granita" in 1959. It presents the story of Umberto Umberto (Umberto being both the author's first name and the Italian form of "Humbert") and his illicit obsession with the elderly "Granita".
- Jean Kerr wrote a short piece in 1959 called "Can This Romance Be Saved: Lolita and Humbert Consult a Marriage Counselor". It appears as a chapter in her second book, The Snake Has All the Lines. This is a parody in which Lolita and Humbert's story is told in the style of the Ladies' Home Journal column "Can This Marriage Be Saved?". Lolita voices her rather mundane complaints in a definite voice of her own, and the marriage counselor holds out some hope for their relationship after Humbert is released from prison at age eighty-five, by which time he may be mature enough for Lolita.
- Published in 1992, Poems for Men who Dream of Lolita by Kim Morrissey contains poems which purport to be written by Lolita herself, reflecting on the events in the story, a sort of diary in poetry form. Morrissey portrays Lolita as an innocent, wounded soul. In Lolita Unclothed, a documentary by Camille Paglia, Morrissey complains that in the novel Lolita has "no voice". Morrisey's retelling was adapted into an opera by composer Sid Rabinovitch, and performed at the New Music Festival in Winnipeg in 1993.
- Gregor von Rezzori's Ein Fremder in Lolitaland. Ein Essay ("A Stranger in Lolitaland. An Essay", 1993), first published in English by Vanity Fair.
- The 1995 novel Diario di Lo by Pia Pera retells the story from Lolita's point of view, making a few modifications to the story and names. (For example, Lolita does not die, and her last name is now "Maze".) Nabokov's son sued to halt publication of the English translation (Lo's Diary); the parties ultimately settled, allowing publication to go forward. "There are only two reasons for such a book: gossip and style," writes Richard Corliss, adding that Lo's Diary "fails both ways".
- Steve Martin wrote the short story "Lolita at Fifty", included in his collection Pure Drivel of 1999, which is a gently humorous look at how Dolores Haze's life might have turned out. She has gone through many husbands. Richard Corliss writes that: "In six pages Martin deftly sketches a woman who has known and used her allure for so long—ever since she was 11 and met Humbert Humbert—that it has become her career."
- Emily Prager states in the foreword to her novel Roger Fishbite that she wrote it mainly as a literary parody of Vladimir Nabokov's Lolita, partly as a "reply both to the book and to the icon that the character Lolita has become". Prager's novel, set in the 1990s, is narrated by the Lolita character, thirteen-year-old Lucky Lady Linderhoff.

== References in media ==
=== Books ===
- The Bookshop (1978) is a novel by Penelope Fitzgerald, whose heroine's downfall is precipitated in part by stocking copies of Lolita.
- In the novel Welcome to the N.H.K. (2002) by Tatsuhiko Takimoto, chapter 5 is titled "A Humbert Humbert for the Twenty-First Century". The protagonist, Tatsuhiro Satō, becomes obsessed with online child pornography.
- Reading Lolita in Tehran (2003) is a memoir about teaching government-banned Western literary classics to women in the world of an Islamic Iran, which author Azar Nafisi describes as dominated in the 1980s by fundamentalist "morality squads". Stories about the lives of her book club members are interspersed with critical commentary on Lolita and three other Western novels. Lolita in particular is dubbed the ultimate "forbidden" novel and becomes a metaphor for life in Iran. Although Nafisi states that the metaphor is not allegorical (p. 35), she does want to draw parallels between "victim and jailer" (p. 37). She implies that, like the principal character in Lolita, the regime in Iran imposes their "dream upon our reality, turning us into his figments of imagination". In both cases, the protagonist commits the "crime of solipsizing another person's life". February 2011 saw the premiere of a concert performance of an opera based on Reading Lolita in Tehran at the University of Maryland School of Music with music by doctoral student Elisabeth Mehl Greene and a libretto co-written by Iranian-American poet Mitra Motlagh. Azar Nafisi was closely involved in the development of the project and participated in an audience Q&A session after the premiere.
- The Lolita Effect: The Media Sexualization of Young Girls and What We Can Do About It is a 2008 feminist non-fiction book which explores the theory that media sexualization hinders the healthy development of pre-adolescent and adolescent girls. Its title is derived from Lolita.
- My Dark Vanessa is Kate Elizabeth Russell's 2020 debut novel. The protagonist in the novel, Vanessa, receives a copy of Lolita from her English teacher, who then sexually abuses her. The dedication page of My Dark Vanessa reads: "To the real-life Dolores Hazes and Vanessa Wyes whose stories have not yet been heard, believed, or understood", citing the victim of Lolita. My Dark Vanessa has been compared to Lolita, but as told from the victim's perspective.

=== Film and television ===
- In "The Missing Page", one of the most popular episodes (from 1960) of the British sitcom Hancock's Half Hour, Tony Hancock has read virtually every book in the library except Lolita, which is always out on loan. He repeatedly asks if it has been returned. When it is eventually returned, there is a commotion amongst the library users who all want the book. This specific incident in the episode is discussed in a 2003 article on the decline of the use of public libraries in Britain by G. K. Peatling.
- In the movie Jab Jab Phool Khile (1965), Rita Khanna (Nanda) reads Lolita in the houseboat at the time of teaching Hindi to Raja (Shashi Kapoor).
- In the Woody Allen film Manhattan (1979), when Mary (Diane Keaton) discovers Isaac Davis (Allen) is dating a 17-year-old (Mariel Hemingway), she says, "Somewhere Nabokov is smiling." Alan A. Stone speculates that Lolita had inspired Manhattan. Graham Vickers describes the female lead in Allen's movie as "a Lolita that is allowed to express her own point of view" and emerges from the relationship "graceful, generous, and optimistic".
- In the Jim Jarmusch film Broken Flowers, Bill Murray's character comes across an overtly sexualized girl named Lolita. Although Murray's character says it is an "interesting choice of name", Roger Ebert notes that "Neither daughter nor mother seems to know that the name Lolita has literary associations."
- In the film Sorry, Baby (2025), Agnes (Eva Victor) is shown repeatedly reading Lolita and discusses the book in the English Literature class she teaches.

=== Popular music ===
- In The Police song "Don't Stand So Close to Me", about a schoolgirl's crush on her teacher, the final verse states, "It's no use, he sees her/ he starts to shake and cough / just like the old man in / that book by Nabokov."
- "Moi... Lolita" (English: "Me... Lolita") is the debut single of the French singer Alizée, which was released on her debut album Gourmandises (2000) when she was 15.
- In the title song of her mainstream debut album, One of the Boys, Katy Perry says that she "studied Lolita religiously", and the cover-shot of the album references Lolita's appearance in the earlier Stanley Kubrick film. She identifies with the character, named a guitar of hers "Lolita", and had her fashion sense at a young age influenced by Swain's outfits in the later Adrian Lynne film. Charles A. Hohman from PopMatters noted that one summer, the tomboy lifestyle just didn't hold her interest, so she started 'studying Lolita religiously' and noticing guys noticing her.
- Mexican singer Belinda released "Lolita", as the theme song for the telenovela Niñas Mal, which was later included on her album Carpe Diem (2010). The track references Nabokov as "the author behind Lolita as a term", and portrays Belinda as its "inventor". It also alludes to the heart-shaped glasses popularized in visual adaptations of the novel.
- Rolling Stone has noted that Lana Del Rey's 2012 album Born to Die has "loads of Lolita references", and it has a bonus track entitled "Lolita". She has herself described the album's persona to a reviewer from The New Yorker as a combination of a "gangster Nancy Sinatra" and "Lolita lost in the hood". The reviewer notes that "her invocations of Sinatra and Lolita are entirely appropriate to the sumptuous backing tracks" and that one of the album's singles, "Off to the Races", repeatedly quotes from the novel's opening sentence: "light of my life, fire of my loins".

== See also ==
- The Enchanter
- Lolita Anime
- Lolita Syndrome
- Lolicon
- Lolita Express

== Audiobooks ==
- 2005: Lolita (read by Jeremy Irons), Random House Audio, ISBN 978-0-7393-2206-2
