= Roger Fishbite =

1999 novel by Emily Prager

- Author: Emily Prager
- Language: English
- Genre: Fiction
- Publisher: Random House
- Publication date: November 1999
- Publication place: United States
- Media type: Print
- Pages: 187
- ISBN: 9780679410539
- OCLC: 39143159
- Dewey Decimal: 813.54
- LC Class: PS3566.R25

Roger Fishbite is a novel by the American writer and journalist Emily Prager, which was published in 1999.

== Themes and literary connections ==
The novel was written partly as a literary parody of Vladimir Nabokov's 1955 novel Lolita, partly as a "reply both to the book and to the icon that the character Lolita has become." It tells the story of thirteen-year-old Lucky Lady Linderhoff, and her mother, and their lodger, whom Lucky calls Roger Fishbite.

While taking its inspiration from Nabokov's Lolita, Prager's novel is narrated by Lucky, not Fishbite, and displays a number of twists and turns that differ from the original text. Prager also updates the story, setting it in the modern-day period, rather than choosing to set it in the 1950s.

== Reviews ==
At the heart of the novel is the issue that Lucky raises constantly throughout: The way in which children in America (and western society in general, I would add) are hated and feared by a society that seeks to eroticise them whilst at the same time destroying them.

What prevents the novel from devolving into an inside joke is the enthralling voice of Lucky Linderhof, who, at nearly 15, tells her tale with the world-weariness befitting an elder statesman of child abuse.
