= After the Flood (novel) =

1982 novel by P. C. Jersild

- Author: P. C. Jersild
- Original title: Efter floden
- Language: Swedish
- Published: 1982
- Publication place: Sweden

After the Flood (Swedish: Efter floden) is a 1982 novel by the Swedish novelist P. C. Jersild. It was well received as it played into the contemporary fear of nuclear holocaust. P.C. Jersild was an active anti-nuclear campaigner as part of the Nobel Prize–winning NGO, International Physicians for the Prevention of Nuclear War.

== Plot summary ==
Jersild used his medical knowledge of the long-term effects of a nuclear holocaust to great effect in this novel, which relates the adventures of a young man dumped on the island of Gotland some 30 years after a worldwide nuclear catastrophe. Humanity is about to go out with a whimper. The only inhabitants of the island are a band of aging convicts and a handful of religious women, also advanced in years, plus a few hermits. The economy is reduced to barter and plunder and the only medical care is provided by an ex-baseball player, who becomes the reluctant mentor of the protagonist. A ray of hope is introduced in the story with the arrival of a young Finnish woman, but it all ends in misery.
