= Emily Prager =

American writer (born 1948)

- Born: April 21, 1948 (age 78); Tucson, Arizona, U.S.
- Education: Barnard College
- Occupations: Author, journalist, teacher, actress, comedian

Emily Prager (born April 21, 1948) is an American author, journalist, actress and comedian. Prager grew up in Texas, Taiwan, and Greenwich Village, New York City. She is a graduate of the Brearley School, Barnard College and has a master's degree in Applied Linguistics.

She has written for The Daily Telegraph, The New York Times, Penthouse, The Guardian, and Village Voice.

== Career ==
Prager starred in the daily TV soap opera The Edge of Night from 1968 to 1972. She was later a contributing editor of The National Lampoon, a performer on The National Lampoon Radio Hour and worked and appeared in the High School Yearbook Parody. Her also work appeared in Titters, A Book of Humor by Women. She was a writer for, and briefly a cast member of Saturday Night Live in 1981. Although she did not appear in the single episode for which she was credited as a featured player (the last episode of the 1980–1981 season, with Jr. Walker and the All-Stars as musical guests, but there was no definitive host, even though some sources claim that Chevy Chase hosted this episode), she appeared uncredited in five episodes, between 1977 and 1981.

She was a writer-performer in the cult film Mr. Mike's Mondo Video and Robert Longo's Arena Brains. Her works include a compendium of her humor writing, In the Missionary Position, the acclaimed short story collection A Visit From the Footbinder and Other Stories, the novels Eve's Tattoo, Clea and Zeus Divorce, and Roger Fishbite, and a memoir, Wuhu Diary. She has been a columnist for the Village Voice, The New York Times, The Daily Telegraph, Penthouse, and The Guardian.

== Personal life ==
She is a Literary Lion of the New York Public Library and in the year 2000, she received the first online journalism award for commentary given by Columbia University Graduate School of Journalism. She taught at the Shanghai American School (Pudong Campus) in Shanghai, China. Dana Elcar was her stepfather.

== Writings ==
=== Novels ===
- Clea and Zeus Divorce (1987)
- Eve's Tattoo (1991)
- Roger Fishbite (1999)

=== Collections ===
- A Visit From the Footbinder and Other Stories (1982)
- In the Missionary Position: 25 Years of Humour Writing (1999)

=== Memoir ===
- Wuhu Diary: On Taking My Adopted Daughter Back to Her Hometown in China (2001)

=== Miscellaneous ===
- World War II Resistance Stories (1979, with Arthur Prager)
- The Official I-Hate-Video Games Handbook (1982)

=== Contributor ===
- Titters, A Book of Humor by Women (1976)
- The National Lampoon – Contributing Editor

== Television and filmography ==
- Arena Brains
- The Edge of Night
- Tarzoon: Shame of the Jungle
- Mr. Mike's Mondo Video
- The National Lampoon Radio Hour
- Saturday Night Live (Season 6; 1 episode; Uncredited extra between years of 1977 and 1981; credited as a featured player in 1981; however never physically appeared on air; likewise she never actually appeared; in any single given individually; sketches.)

== Awards ==
- 2000, Online Journalism Award for Commentary, Columbia University Graduate School of Journalism

Literary Lion of the New York Public Library
