= The Guardian's 100 Best Novels Written in English =

2015 list selected by Robert McCrum

The Guardian's 100 best novels is a list of the best English-language novels as selected by Robert McCrum for The Guardian in 2015.

== Reception ==
McCrum has received both praise and criticism for his 2015 list. Owing to this, he created a brief epilogue to the series, in which he explained many of his choices, such as his choice of Emma of the Jane Austen novels. He also explained regrettable exclusions, such as Light Years, Gravity's Rainbow, Crash, A Confederacy of Dunces, Slaughterhouse Five, All the Pretty Horses, Wise Blood, The Pursuit of Love, Rebecca and Tinker, Tailor, Soldier, Spy. He also commented on purposeful exclusions owing to his personal preference, such as books by Elizabeth Gaskell, Norman Mailer, Kingsley Amis, John Fowles, Walter Scott and Iris Murdoch, the latter of which had caused a surge of controversy in the disclusion of The Black Prince. He aroused controversy again, however, in, at the end of this article, including a list of his opinion of the ten greatest novels of all: Emma, Wuthering Heights, Moby-Dick, Middlemarch, The Adventures of Huckleberry Finn, Heart of Darkness, The Rainbow, Ulysses, Mrs Dalloway, and The Great Gatsby.

One of the most frequent complaints was that, of the 100, only 21 were by women. Reviewer Rachel Cooke desired Elizabeth Gaskell's Mary Barton, Harriet Beecher Stowe's Uncle Tom's Cabin, Erica Jong's Fear of Flying, Margaret Atwood's The Handmaid's Tale, books by Eudora Welty, Carson McCullers, Willa Cather and Margaret Kennedy. Cooke was also frustrated by the disclusion of Angela Carter, saying that "Carter’s influence cannot be overstated: her allegorical, taboo-breaking narratives have been genuinely influential." Cooke favoured taking out The Thirty-Nine Steps, and replacing it with The Talented Mr. Ripley, and taking out Joy in the Morning, preferring either The Pursuit of Love, or E. M. Delafield's Diary of a Provincial Lady.

Another criticism was a lack of Irish authors. Many complained of there being only nine books- Gulliver’s Travels by Jonathan Swift (1726), The Life and Opinions of Tristram Shandy, Gentleman by Laurence Sterne (1759), The Picture of Dorian Gray by Oscar Wilde (1891); Dracula by Bram Stoker (1897), Ulysses by James Joyce (1922), Murphy by Samuel Beckett (1938), At Swim-Two-Birds by Flann O'Brien (1939), The Heat of the Day by Elizabeth Bowen (1948) and Amongst Women by John McGahern (1990). Claire Armitstead compiled complaints of no works by these authors: Edna O'Brien, William Trevor, John Banville, Colm Tóibín, David Lodge, Maria Edgeworth, J. G. Farrell and Sheridan le Fanu. The first mentioned exclusion caused perhaps the most controversy.

The Guardian asked readers a fortnight after the conclusion of McCrum's list to name the novels that they wish had been on the list. The book with the highest number of votes was Chinua Achebe's Things Fall Apart, the second Arundhati Roy's The God of Small Things, and the third Toni Morrison's Beloved. The fourth was Margaret Atwood's The Handmaid's Tale, fifth, Cormac McCarthy's Blood Meridian, then Rohinton Mistry's A Fine Balance, followed by David Foster Wallace's Infinite Jest, then Kurt Vonnegut's Slaughterhouse Five, nine with J.R.R Tolkien's The Lord of the Rings, concluding the top ten with Glen Duncan's I, Lucifer, eleventh being J.K. Rowling's Harry Potter and the Philosopher's Stone, twelfth, Alasdair Gray's Lanark: A Life in Four Books, thirteenth, Stranger in a Strange Land by Robert A Heinlein, penultimately Alice Walker's The Color Purple, and finally, Woman on the Edge of Time by Marge Piercy.
