= P. C. Jersild =

Swedish physician and writer

Per Christian Jersild
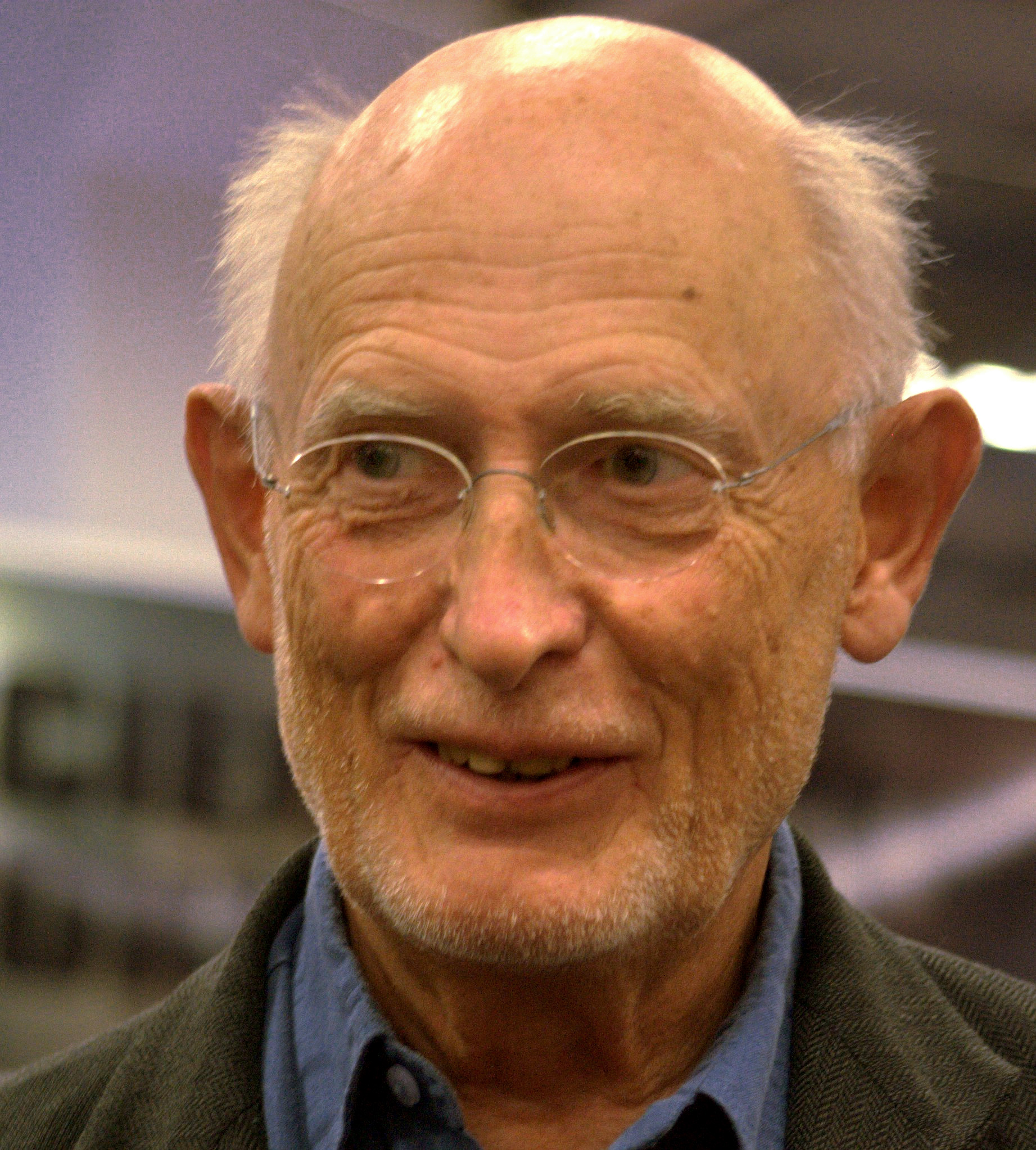
- P.C. Jersild 2009
- Born: 14 March 1935 (age 91); Katrineholm, Sweden
- Occupations: author, physician
- Writing career
- Period: 1960 – now

Per Christian Jersild, better known as P. C. Jersild, (born 14 March 1935) is a Swedish author and physician. He also holds an honorary doctorate from the Faculty of Medicine at Uppsala University from 22 January 2000, and another one in engineering from the Royal Institute of Technology (1999).

== Biography ==
P. C. Jersild was born in Katrineholm in a middle-class family.

His first book was Räknelära which he released 1960 at the age of 25, although he had already been writing for 10 years at that time. Until now he has written 35 books, usually focused on social criticism. His most famous work is Barnens ö (Children's Island), which tells the story of a young boy, on the verge of adulthood, who runs off from a children's summer camp to spend time alone in the big city, Stockholm. Other notable books include Babels hus (The House of Babel), which gives an account of the inhuman treatment of patients at a large modern hospital, said to be modeled on the Karolinska Hospital in Huddinge outside Stockholm, and the science fiction novel En levande själ (A Living Soul), about a living, thinking and feeling human brain floating in a container of liquid.

Aside from his literary production, Jersild has also been a columnist for Dagens Nyheter since the mid-1980s. In 1999, he was elected a member of the Royal Swedish Academy of Sciences.

== Awards ==
- Svenska Dagbladet's Literary Prize 1973
- The Aniara Prize 1974
- The Kellgren Prize 1990
- "Samfundet De Nios stora pris" (Society of the Nine's Grans Prize) 1998
- Övralidspriset 2007
- Ingemar Hedenius Award 2007

== Bibliography ==
- Räknelära, 1960
- Till varmare länder, 1961
- Ledig lördag, 1963
- Resa genom världen, 1965
- Pyton, 1966
- Prins Valiant och Konsum, 1966
- Grisjakten, 1968
- Vi ses i Song My, 1970
- Drömpojken, 1970
- Uppror bland marsvinen, 1972
- Stumpen, 1973
- Djurdoktorn, 1973 (The Animal Doctor, trans. Margareta Paul & David M. Paul)
- Den elektriska kaninen, 1974
- Barnens ö, 1976 (see also the 1980 film) (Children's Island, trans. Joan Tate)
- Babels hus, 1978 (House of Babel, trans. Joan Tate)
- En levande själ, 1980 (A Living Soul, trans. Rika Lesser)
- Professionella bekännelser, 1981
- Efter floden, 1982 (After the Flood, trans. George Blecher & Lone Thygesen Blecher)
- Lit de parade, 1983
- Den femtionde frälsaren, 1984
- Geniernas återkomst, 1987
- Svarta villan, 1987
- Röda hund, 1988
- Ett ensamt öra, 1989
- Fem hjärtan i en tändsticksask, 1989
- En livsåskådsningsbok, 1990
- Alice och Nisse i lustiga huset, 1991
- Holgerssons, 1991
- Hymir, 1993
- En gammal kärlek, 1995
- Ett gammal kylskåp och en förkyld hund, 1995
- Sena sagor, 1998
- Darwins ofullbordade: Om människans biologiska natur, 1999
- Ljusets Drottning, 2000
- Hundra Fristående Kolumner i Dagens Nyheter, 2002
- Ypsilon, 2012
