= Fritiof Nilsson Piraten =

Swedish writer

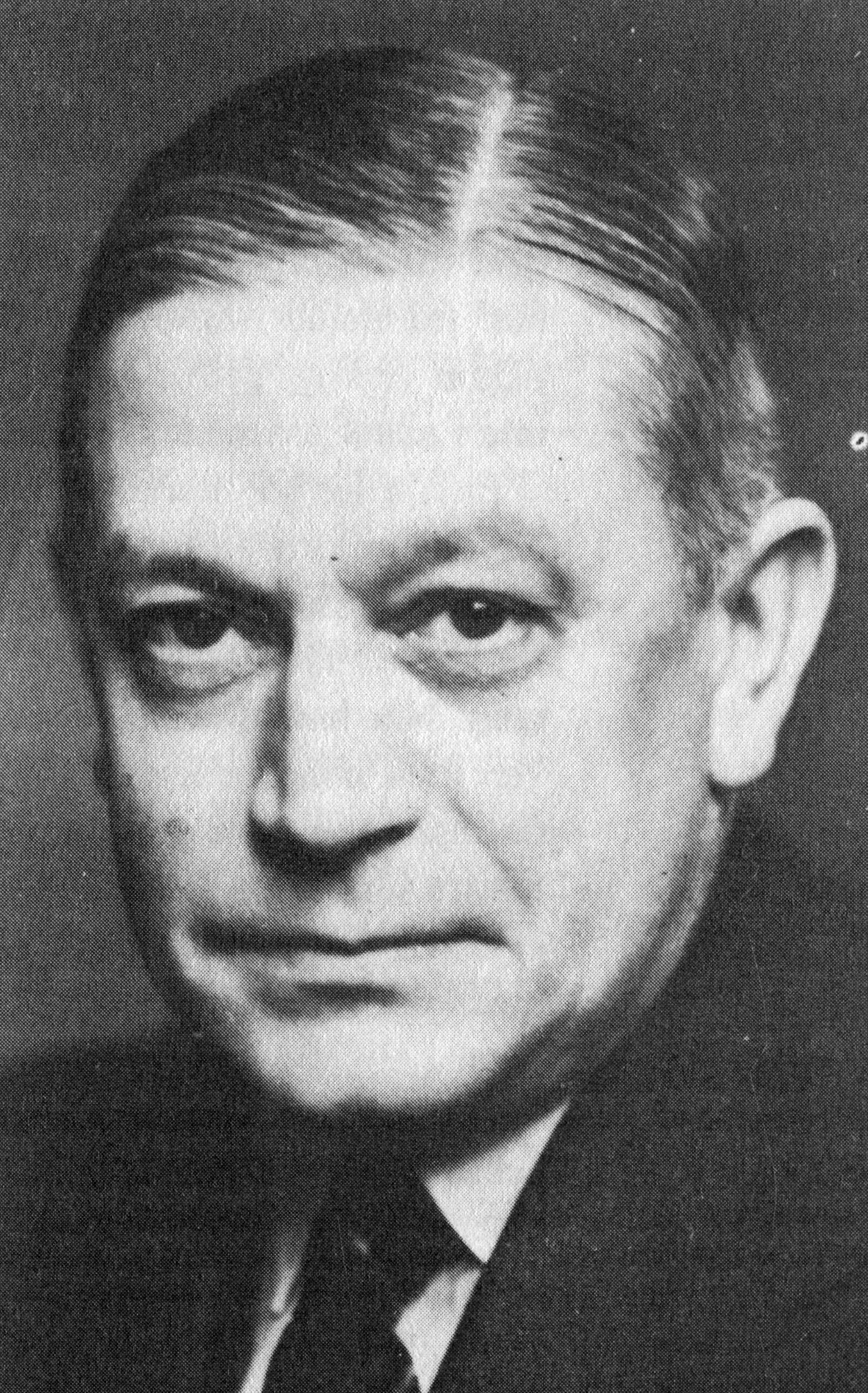
- Notable works: Bombi Bitt

Fritiof Nilsson Piraten ("the Pirate") (4 December 1895 in Vollsjö – 31 January 1972 in Malmö), born Nils Fritiof Adam Nilsson was a Swedish author and lawyer, from the south-most province Skåne, which plays an important role in many of his books.

Educated as a lawyer at Lund he left a successful practice in 1932 to write, and that same year published his debut, Bombi Bitt och jag ("Bombi Bitt and me"), a Scanian Tom Sawyer-like story of sorts. Bombi Bitt is what he is most remembered for; it was made into both a movie in 1936, and a TV-series in 1968, the series starring Stellan Skarsgård of present Hollywood-fame in the lead role as Bombi Bitt, with Piraten himself as the narrator. Piraten went on to write two more books about Bombi Bitt, one in 1946 and one appeared posthumously in 1974. Most of his books are collections of bucolic anecdotes about eccentric people in Skåne, such as his novel, Bock i örtagård ("Buck in herbal garden", 1933), about an illiterate horse-dealer and squire who bullies his way into a church-wardenship to win a bet. A movie was released 1958 based on this novel. A later novel, Bokhandlaren som slutade bada ("The book-dealer who ceased bathing", 1937) is a deeply tragic story, dotted with occasional comic situations, about a too-sensitive man falling in love with a woman and marrying her before he realizes who she really is, and the disasters that follow. 1969 a movie came out based on this novel. Most of his books are considered to fit well in the tall tale category.

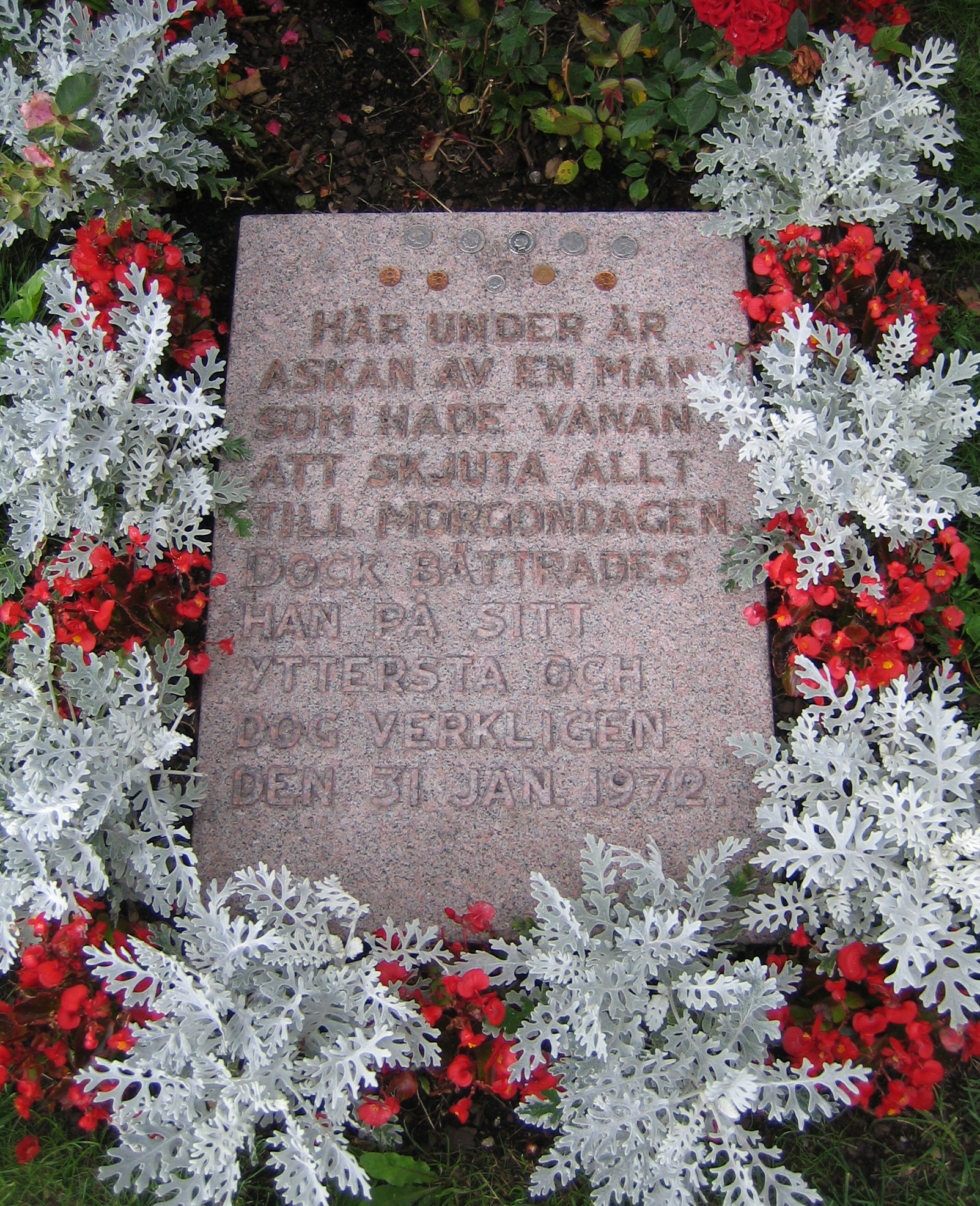
Gravestone on Ravlunda cemetery. The inscription roughly translates into: Here below are the ashes of a man who had the habit of putting everything off until tomorrow. But in his last days he improved, and did actually die on 31 January 1972.

Nilsson was deliberately non-literary, getting along with sailors, farmers and businessmen, and probably got his nickname for that reason (although he always insisted that it was there to distinguish him from another Nilsson). His humour is based more in understatement than in hyperbole, although the stories may be wild enough. His famous epitaph is representative of his style.

== Sources ==
- Hägg, Göran: Den svenska litteraturhistorien. Stockholm 1999.
