= Elsa Morante =

Italian author (1912–1985)

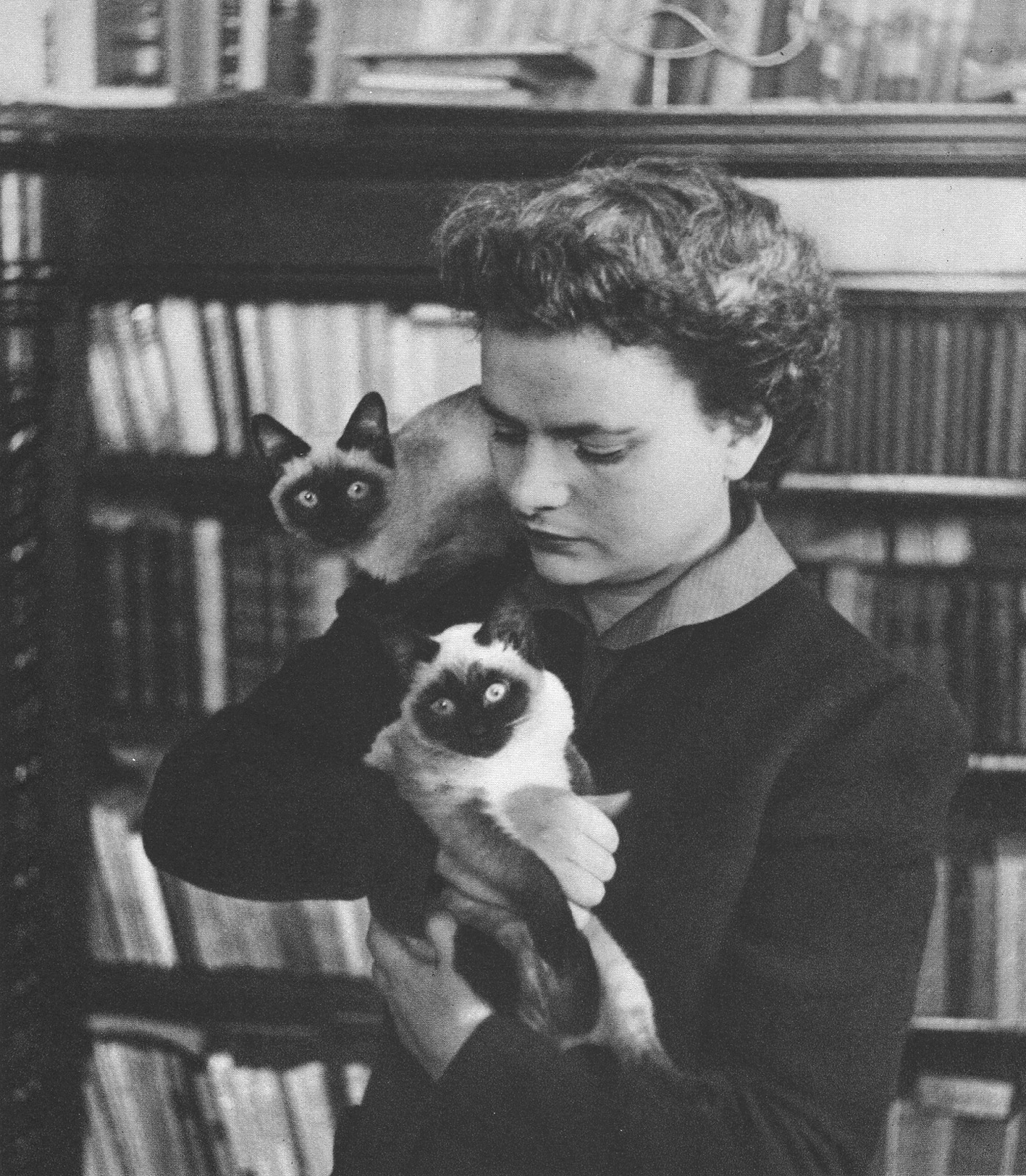
- Born: 18 August 1912; Rome, Kingdom of Italy
- Died: 25 November 1985 (aged 73); Rome, Italy
- Occupation: Novelist
- Spouse: Alberto Moravia (m. 1941)
- Writing career
- Notable work: La Storia (History)
- Notable awards: Viareggio Prize (1948); Strega Prize (1957)

Elsa Morante (pronounced [ˈelsa moˈrante, ˈɛl-]; 18 August 1912 – 25 November 1985) was an Italian novelist, poet, translator and children's books author. Her novel La Storia (History) is included in the Bokklubben World Library List of 100 Best Books of All Time.

== Life and career ==
Elsa Morante was born in Rome in 1912, the daughter of Irma (née Poggibonsi), a schoolteacher, and Augusto Morante. Her mother came from a Jewish family in Modena. When she was a teenager Morante discovered that Francesco Lo Monaco, a family neighbour, was her biological father. Except for a brief period during World War II, she resided in Rome until her death in 1985.

Morante started writing at an early age. Without having much support from her parents, she relied mostly on self-education. She began writing short stories in the mid-1930s. Some were published in various publications and journals, including periodicals for children. Her first book, a collection of short stories called Il Gioco Segreto (The Secret Game), was published in 1941. In the same year, she married fellow novelist and film critic Alberto Moravia. In 1942 she wrote her first children's book, Le Bellissime avventure di Caterì dalla Trecciolina (republished in 1959 as Le straordinarie avventure di Caterina).

During the German occupation of Italy late in World War II, Morante and Moravia, fearful because of their Jewish heritage, fled Rome to repair in Southern Lazio, in a village near Fondi and where there were several poor families of shepherds, called in the past, with an offensive term, ciociari in the modern Roman dialect. The experience would inspire Morante's La Storia (1974) and Moravia's La Ciociara (translated in English in 1957 as Two Women and later made into a film by Vittorio De Sica). During her time in the territory of Fondi, she began translating the work of Katherine Mansfield. Morante decided to briefly return to war-torn Rome at great personal risk to retrieve the manuscript of what would be her first published novel, Menzogna e sortilegio, and get winter clothes.

At the end of the war, Morante and Moravia met the American translator William Weaver, who helped them to break into the English-speaking market. Her first novel, 1948's Menzogna e sortilegio, won the Viareggio Prize, and was published in the United States in 1951 as House of Liars. Despite her international success, Morante found the English translation quite disappointing. Morante's next novel, L'isola di Arturo, was published in 1957 and won the Strega Prize. In 1961 Morante and Moravia separated, without divorcing, and Morante's writing became more sporadic. She destroyed much of the work written during that period, although she did publish a novel, The Andalusian Shawl (1963), and a poem, The Adventure. Her next work, Il mondo salvato dai ragazzini (The World Saved by Children), a mix of poetry and songs mostly addressed to her new lover, artist Bill Morrow, was published in 1968. In 1963 Pier Paolo Pasolini invited Morante to select the music for his film The Gospel According to St. Matthew. She also collaborated in casting the actors.

In 1974 Morante published La Storia, a book chronicling the events surrounding Rome during World War II. It became a national bestseller in Italy, partially due to Morante's insistence that publisher Einaudi would put it out in an economical paperback edition. Despite its commercial success, the book provoked furious and at times negative reactions from left-wing literary critics, who disliked its anti-ideological tone. After Pier Paolo Pasolini wrote a negative review of the book, Morante broke off their friendship. La Storia was adapted into a Rai television series in 1986.

Morante's final novel, Aracoeli (1982), has been perceived as a summary of all the motifs and trends present in her writing, such as the innocence of childhood and the importance of creating fantastic worlds to escape from dreary realities.

The first English-language biography of Morante, A Woman of Rome, by Lily Tuck, was published in 2008.

== Major themes ==
Morante cultivated a love for music, books and cats. Her favorite books included The Iliad, Don Quixote, and Hamlet. She was also interested in Freudian psychology, Plato and Simone Weil. Southern Italy is also used as the backdrop for much of her work. Most of Morante's greatest works are shaped by her choices and experiences in life and are reflected in her protagonists. One of the central themes in Morante's work is Narcissism. The majority of Morante's leading characters use autobiography as a way to seek self-therapy and hope. Narration becomes a leading tool. Her writing is essential for the formation of a positive consciousness about her personal memories. Another important aspect of Morante's work is the metaphor of love. According to her, love can be passion and obsession, and can lead to despair or destruction. This trajectory is connected to her love for a nine-year-old boy when she was only two and a half years old. According to her, her first love was a heaven, but then it transformed into a hell. The metaphor of love can easily be traced back to one of her most famous poems, "Alibi." Love and Narcissism are themes well connected to each other. Most of Morante's characters seek love, not because they have true feelings for the person they fell in love with, but because they need to cover the feelings of emptiness from their childhood. It is through love and narcissism that Morante introduces other themes such as the role of motherhood and the meaning of childhood experiences.

== Bibliography ==
=== Novels and novellas ===
- Diario 1938 (1938) (Diary, publ. Einaudi, 1989 ISBN 8806116614
- Menzogna e sortilegio (1948) (House of Liars, trans. Adrienne Foulke, 1951; also as Lies and Sorcery, trans. Jenny McPhee, 2023) ISBN 9783458145752
- L'isola di Arturo (1957) (Arturo's Island, trans. Isabel Quigly, 1959; trans. Ann Goldstein, 2019) ISBN 9788806138387
- La Storia (1974) (History: A Novel, trans. William Weaver, 1977) ISBN 9780394498027
- Aracoeli (1982) (Aracoeli, trans. William Weaver, 1984) ISBN 9780394535180

=== Short story collections ===
- Il gioco segreto (1941) – twenty short stories
- Le straordinarie avventure di Caterì dalla Trecciolina (1942) – later revised, expanded and republished as Le straordinarie avventure di Caterina, containing thirteen short stories
- Lo scialle andaluso (1963) – twelve short stories
- Racconti dimenticati (1937–1947) twenty early short stories, published by Einaudi in 2002.
- Aneddoti infantili (1939–1940) – fifteen short stories that originally appeared in the magazine "Oggi", published by Einaudi in 2013.

=== Poetry ===
- Alibi (1958)
- Il Mondo Salvato dai Ragazzini (1968), which includes "La canzone degli F.P. e degli I.M.in tre parti" The song of the H.F. and the U.M. in three parts, transl. M. Palladino & P. Hart (Joker 2007). A full translation by Cristina Viti, The World Saved By Kids, was published by Seagull Books in 2016. https://press.uchicago.edu/ucp/books/book/distributed/W/bo25015883.html

=== Children's books ===
- Le straordinarie avventure di Caterina (1959)

=== Non-fiction ===
- Pro e contro la bomba atomica (1987, essays)
