= Begotten (film) =

1989 American experimental horror film

- 1995 VHS cover art
- Directed by: E. Elias Merhige
- Written by: E. Elias Merhige
- Produced by: E. Elias Merhige
- Starring: Brian Salzburg; Donna Dempsey; Stephen Charles Barry
- Cinematography: E. Elias Merhige
- Edited by: Noëlle Penraat
- Music by: Evan Albam
- Production companies: Theatreofmaterial; William Markle Associates (sound)
- Distributed by: World Artists Home Video; Kino Lorber (2026 re-release)
- Release date: October 24, 1989 (Montreal World Film Festival)
- Running time: 72 minutes
- Country: United States
- Language: English (intertitles)
- Budget: $33,000 (est.)
- Box office: $69,713 (2026 limited release)

Begotten is a 1989 American horror film written and directed by E. Elias Merhige. It stars the largely unknown actors Brian Salzburg, Donna Dempsey, Stephen Charles Barry and members of Merhige's theatre company Theatreofmaterial. The experimental film's unconventional narrative depicts the suicide of a godlike figure and the births of Mother Earth and the Son of Earth, who undertake a journey across a dying world. Merhige directed two short film sequels: 2006's Din of Celestial Birds and 2022's Polia & Blastema: A Cosmic Opera.

Merhige conceived Begotten as a dance piece for experimental theatre. It has a gritty visual style, intended to evoke film stock degraded through time and wear. Inspired by documentary footage of the aftermath of the bombing of Hiroshima, he decided on a feature film. As with the Hiroshima footage, Begotten is silent.

Begotten is infused with mystic and religious themes. Critics have debated whether it reflects popular attitudes towards the origins of life and religion at the time of its production and portrays creation through the mythic and religious traditions. Some writers have interpreted the film as an examination of the cycle of life and mankind's relationship with nature. Other themes include the Nietzschean view of order and chaos, societal norms and the perception of reality.

After completion, Merhige spent two years trying to find a distributor. It debuted at the Montreal World Film Festival and later screened at the San Francisco International Film Festival, with the film critics Tom Luddy and Peter Scarlet in attendance. The two brought it to the attention of the critic Susan Sontag, whose praise was instrumental to its eventual release. It received few reviews, which were mainly polarized.

== Plot ==
The film opens on a dilapidated shack, inside which a robed and masked figure disembowels himself with a straight razor. He dies after cutting open his abdomen and removing his internal organs. A woman in white emerges from his remains. She brings the corpse to arousal and uses his semen to impregnate herself. Time passes and the woman, now visibly pregnant, stands beside a coffin. She gives birth to a fully matured yet malformed man and leaves him lying in the wilderness, convulsing violently and unable to walk.

Soon a tribe of robed nomads arrive, seize him and drag him away by his umbilical cord. He vomits part of his organs, which the tribe accept as gifts. They lead him through a rocky hillside, stopping to drag him into a fire pit where they repeatedly stab him with a fork-like implement and appear to collect some of his blood. They then carry him to a hill and leave him to die. His mother then returns, places a rope around his neck and leads him into a forest as he crawls spasmodically behind her. Later in a quarry, the nomads reappear and strike his head with a club before attacking him with a large stick as his mother stands trance-like nearby.

The nomads fatally cudgel his mother before sexually assaulting her body with their clubs and raping her corpse while her son lies injured. As the nomads leave and the woman's son kneels before her body and mourns her, two robed figures arrive to cover her corpse and carry it away. They travel to a gorge where they and their companions harvest mounds of clay into small jars. The robed men cut the mother's body into small pieces, crushing her bones and placing them into the jars. Meanwhile the son has crawled through a desert and reached the sea some distance away, where the robed men find him, tie him in a sack and murder him, repeating the same process and burying the jars into the crust of the earth. Over time, the burial site becomes lush with flowers and crops. The closing images present the mother, as before, leading her son into the forest as the cycle begins again.

== Cast ==
- Brian Salzburg as God killing himself

An entity who commits suicide by mutilating and disembowelling himself. He is also the father of Mother Earth and Son of Earth.

- Donna Dempsey as Mother Earth:

The mother of the Son of Earth, whom she conceived by using the seed of God killing himself.

- Stephen Charles Barry as Son of Earth (captioned as Flesh on Bone):

The deformed and convulsing son of Mother Earth and God killing himself.

Members of Merhige's theatre company Theatreofmaterial, including Adolpho Vargas, Arthur Streeter, Daniel Harkins, Erik Slavin, James Gandia, Michael Phillips and Terry Andersen, are credited as nomads and robed Figures.

== Production ==
=== Development ===
Begotten was written, produced and directed by Merhige, who, following studies at State University of New York, developed an interest in the theatre after attending several performances while in Manhattan. According to Merhige, he was intrigued by the highly visualized form of storytelling, which provoked what he described as "an otherworldly response". He was particularly interested in the performances of the Japanese butoh dance troupe Sankai Juku, who were known for blending grotesque imagery with a transgressive dance style. Merhige was fascinated by the degree of interconnectivity among its core members—knowing everything about one another and engaging in a more personal level of interaction. In 1985, Merhige founded Theatreofmaterial, (Note: Alternately worded as Theatre of Material.) a small experimental theatre production company based in New York City, intending to create a similar group dynamic.

Merhige conceived Begotten in 1983, (Note: While a 1995 article by Jonathan Rosenbaum alternately lists the date as 1984; Merhige, born in 1964, states he first conceptualized Begotten at age nineteen.) describing its genesis as "a vision that moved through me like a great storm". It was developed into a story format after Merhige suffered an episode of sleep paralysis. The sensation of "feel[ing] like you are dying" and being unable to move provided Merhige with inspiration, and after the symptoms subsided he began writing in an attempt to express his views and beliefs. (Note: Critic Elaine Dutka argues that trauma from the director's near-fatal car accident early in his youth was an early influence. Though Merhige has stated that the experience merely helped form his own ideas and views on life.) The project was originally written as a dance or theatre production, with elements of opera and tragedy. Merhige envisioned the production as an immersive experience, with the sets built around its audience and performed with a live orchestra. After discovering that it would cost a quarter of a million dollars to produce, Merhige abandoned the idea. Merhige later decided to implement the concept into a motion picture after experimenting with his camera. This change in format allowed Merhige the opportunity to document Theatreofmaterial's work, as many of its performers were transitioning outside the company to pursue other interests.

=== Writing and pre-production ===
The writing for Begotten was all Vision material, or whatever you want to call it, and I used those parts that scared me, or that I just couldn't understand—the parts that stuck with me for days and forced me to wonder where within me did this come from? A tableau of the unknown was important to me...It began as a personal myth and ended as a collective myth, a myth of everyone involved in making the film.

— Merhige on the script's collaborative nature

Merhige developed the script with members of Theatreofmaterial. They strove to evoke emotions which they felt were avoided by most directors and performers. Merhige consulted with the television writer and film historian Tom Gunning on the story. In preparation for script-writing, Merhige and members of Theatreofmaterial performed ritual breathing exercises. Merhige described this process as "breath[ing] to the point of hysteria". He brought portions of the work-in-progress script to rehearsals, which were followed by group discussion and reflection on the material as it took shape.

As a visual artist, Merhige said that 19th-century impressionist and symbolist painting were a primary source of influence, and had a profound impact on his crafting "a world that existed between painting and dreams". In addition, earlier paintings by Hieronymus Bosch and Francisco Goya further influenced the film's early development. Merhige was further influenced by the artist Antonin Artaud and philosopher Friedrich Nietzsche, which he felt had not been fully explored on film.

The first draft was completed within six months. The group expanded the script's abstract ideas into more concrete and enactable scenes over the following four and a half months, during a period of extensive rehearsals. Merhige said that the rehearsals were mainly focused on group cohesion rather than specific choreography, which allowed the actors to get "in tune" with their characters.

Begotten was made on a budget of around $33,000 ($84,000 in 2025). It was partially funded by Merhige's grandfather, who had set Merhige up with a trust fund for medical school. (Note: A total of $20,000, adjusted for inflation to $51,000 in 2024.) Additional costs were covered by Merhige from the income he received while working multiple jobs as a special effects artist. Writing on the distinction of such independent projects, Matthew Edwards comments that by financing independently, filmmakers like Merhige were allowed more creative freedom when developing their ideas.

=== Filming ===
Principal photography began in the mid-to-late 1980s and depending on the sources, lasted for between three and five-and-a-half months. Merhige assumed multiple roles, including cinematography and special effects, and used a 16 mm Arriflex camera on a Kodak Plus-X, a black-and-white reversal film stock. Most of the film crew were Theatreofmaterial members, though some film industry professionals were involved, including the costume designer Celia Bryant, and the special effects artist Dean Mercil. Some of Merhige's family assisted with production, including his brother David Merhige, who is credited as the film's field coordinator.

Most of the scenes were shot at a construction site between New York City and New Jersey, where Merhige was permitted to shoot for twenty days when construction crews were not working. The construction crew occasionally assisted by building landscapes for the mountains. The first scene to be filmed was the opening passage depicting God self-disembowelling and Mother Earth emerging from his remains. The sequence where the Son of Earth drags himself across the desert was filmed with a long-focus lens over hot sand, which produced a mirage-like screen distortion.

Time-lapse photographs of sunrises and sunsets were shot by the director, who spent two days in the mountains near Santa Fe and Albuquerque. Additional sequences of sprouting plants were filmed inside a large and specially built terrarium. Merhige characterized the atmosphere during production as a powerful, almost ceremonial experience that was "life-changing" for those involved. After filming wrapped up, Merhige found it difficult to move on from the project and felt a sense of mourning and the loss of an emotional high.

=== Cinematic style ===
The film's decayed aesthetic was achieved through extended processing using an optical printer. Each minute required eight to ten hours of labor to process.

Begotten is shot in a dark, grungy and visceral style. Distorted perspectives and degraded image quality were used to evoke an ancient and otherworldly atmosphere. The film has been described as "a cinematic Rorschach test of grotesque, imagery" and "a feature-length fever dream". Merhige was interested in crafting imagery through analog format and sought a decayed look that suggested the footage had been damaged through time and wear. He said:

I wanted Begotten to look, not as if it were from the twenties, not even as if it were from the nineteenth century, but as if it were from the time of Christ, as if it were a cinematic Dead Sea Scroll that had been buried in the sands, a remnant of a culture with customs and rites that no longer apply to this culture, yet are somewhere underneath it, under the surface of what we call "reality."

The influences for Begotten's visual style include The Cabinet of Dr. Caligari (1920), Blood of the Beasts (1949), Seven Samurai (1954) and The Act of Seeing with One's Own Eyes (1971). He also lists the unconventional styles of Andrzej Munk, Sergei Eisenstein and Luis Buñuel. Other influences identified by critics include David Lynch's Eraserhead (1977), Dimitri Kirsanoff's Ménilmontant (1926) and Tobe Hooper's The Texas Chain Saw Massacre (1974), as well as tribal art, ethnographic studies and the paintings of Piero della Francesca. Visual underminings from 1930s horror films, such as intertitles, was also commented on by David Annwn Jones, who wrote that it was utilized to express its own set of evolving visual ideas and techniques.

Before and during Begotten's shooting, Merhige experimented with different types of film. In one experiment, he ran an unexposed negative against sandpaper to scratch its surface before shooting on the damaged reel, and in another Merhige modified the film emulsion and frame rate to create a staggered time and motion effect. Footage was deliberately shot overexposed, to reduce the details of the image. (Note: Merhige said "I was overexposing things on purpose, knowing I would underexpose things later... Though I didn't know how I was going to underexpose them." In a 2021 retrospective for Film International, Ted Knighton wrote that Merhige also increased the contrast of the film, rendering places and characters as "ghostly silhouettes and abstractions".) Unsatisfied with the results, Merhige decided on an optical printer for further processing. He was unable to find an optical printer priced within his budget, so he built one himself. The printer was constructed in eight months (Note: Attributed to multiple references:) with spare parts from camera stores and special effects houses where he had worked. Merhige had worked as a special effects designer for various companies, including a Disney television series that involved the animation technique of rotoscoping. This experience gave him the technical knowledge needed to handle the film's post-production and visual effects on his own.

The post-production process was time-consuming, with each minute of footage generated by the optical printer taking between eight and ten hours to complete. Each frame of raw footage was fed into the optical printer and projected onto an unused film negative; multiple photographic filters, including color and neutral-density filters, were used to alter the image. Developing the Kodak Plus-X film stock presented a significant challenge. Unprocessed reels required a dust-free environment as the Kodak film stock is notorious for its fragility; each reel was handled with protective gloves to avoid unintended imperfections. Three months of extensive tests were implemented during photographic processing. When a test shot was sent to the laboratory for processing, minuscule calibration errors sometimes ruined the shot and the process had to be restarted. Merhige asked that laboratories adjust their usual development procedures to his custom specifications, but was repeatedly turned away. Eventually, he found Fred Schreck's Kin-O-Lux Labs. (Note: No relation to famed German actor Max Schreck, the subject of Merhige's later film Shadow of the Vampire.) Merhige began a friendship with Schreck who taught him to hand-develop his footage.

Merhige hired his father for consultation, stating that his father was "very open-minded" to the project. Editor and film-maker Aram Avakian, whom Merhige had become acquainted with, also supported and encouraged Merhige to complete the project. Results of the rephotography process removed almost all of the gray midtones from the visible spectrum, leaving only extreme contrasts of black and white. He used similar techniques for segments of his next film, Shadow of the Vampire (2001).

=== Music and sound design ===
Begotten has no dialogue or text apart from its opening intertitles. (Note: Attributed to multiple references:) Merhige chose to make the film silent after viewing documentary footage of the bombing of Hiroshima, having been emotionally affected by the complete silence and lack of voice of the victims. Merhige recalled in 2024:

All of the victims had this look of complete calm and just calm astonishment as they looked millions of miles past the lens of the camera. I remember[ed] thinking that, when life becomes that extreme... that terrifying. When you see things that you can't unsee, and experience things that no one can relate to on the entire planet... you're really left with this spooky, terrifying silence.

Intending to evoke a similar atmosphere to the Hiroshima footage, Merhige developed the film as set "[in] a time that predates spoken language" in which "communication is made on a sensory level". Frustration with storytelling through exposition and the limitations dialogue imposed upon narration also contributed to the lack of dialogue in Begotten.

The film score and sound effects were written and mixed by the then novice composer Evan Albam. Merhige and Albam spent a year working on the soundtrack, crafting the right balance of visual and audio cues. The music is ambient and dirge-like, and contains natural sounds such as bird calls, insect noises and heartbeats. (Note: Attributed to multiple references:) Music in Begotten often mirrors the improvised and incomplete atmosphere of early silent films. The sound effects mixed into the score are often looped, differing from the normal synchronized sound. Writing for the academic journal Film International, the artist Ted Knighton argues that this "incomplete" feel to the sound touched upon the themes of creation. He wrote that Begotten is "not a film of an evolving world, it is [a] film as an evolving world". Scholar Andrew M. Whelan writes, the ambient and unconventional score of Begotten shares the same thematic style as power electronics, a form of noise music, that provokes strong reactions from listeners.

== Release ==
=== Distribution ===
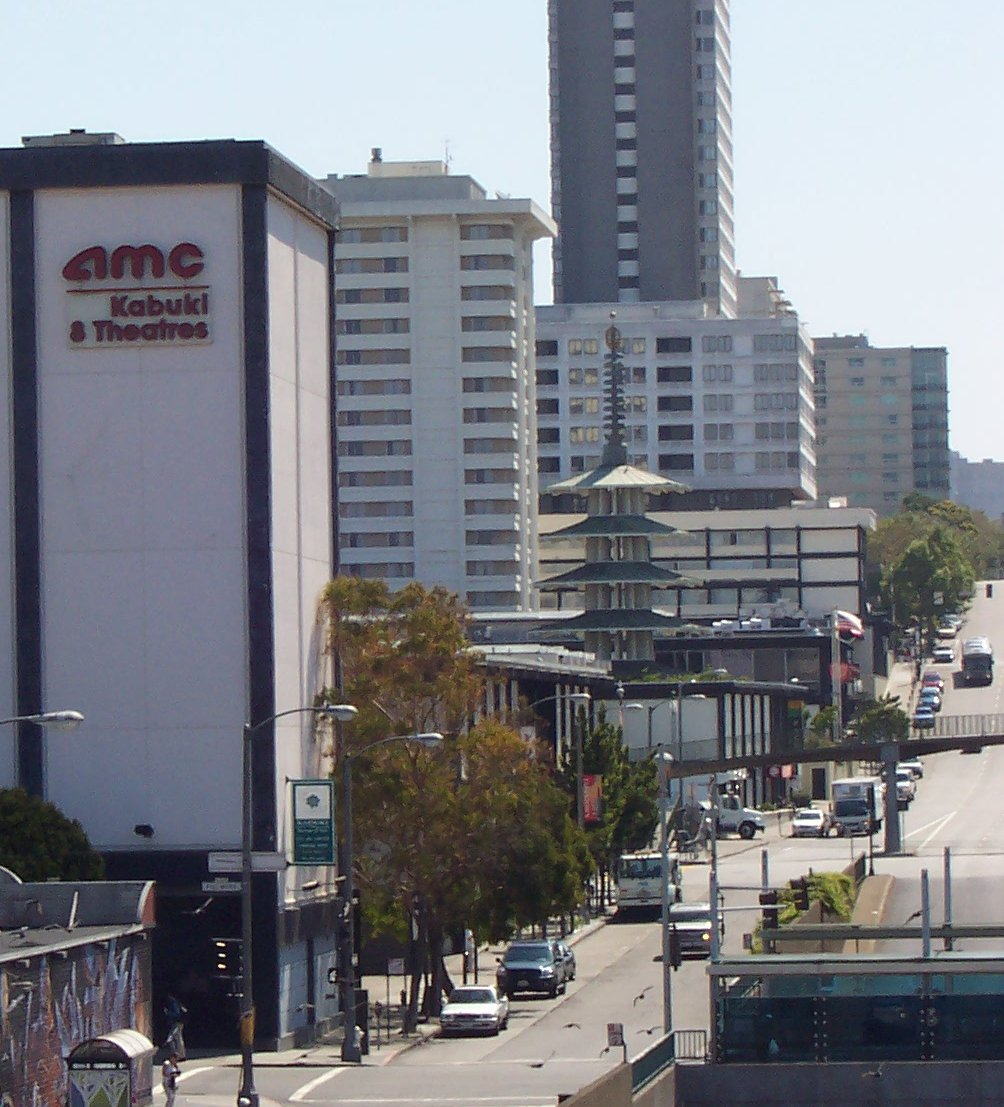
The US premiere of Begotten occurred at the 1990 San Francisco International Film Festival, where it was screened at the Japantown Kabuki 8 multiplex (pictured in 2005).

Having completed the editing, Merhige spent two years trying to find a distributor. Most refused as the film did not fit into a specific genre and thus would be difficult to market. According to Merhige, "everyone laughed at me, saying 'We don't know what this is...'" Merhige took it to several museums; only two showed interest, but he turned both down as he felt that they were not the right choice. As a result, he became very protective of the film and only screened it to people he thought he could trust.

To gain more exposure, Merhige created a video master of the film, and sent copies to various film organizations, including the Pacific Film Archive. Merhige was contacted a month later by the curator of the archive, who requested permission to screen the film. Through these private screenings, film critics Tom Luddy and Peter Scarlet became fascinated by its visual style. Although uncertain how it might be received, they put together several screenings at the San Francisco International Film Festival followed by a showing for the critic Susan Sontag. (Note: Attributed to multiple references:) Sontag held a private screening at her home, (Note: Merhige later recalled that Sontag had contacted him about setting up these private screenings, which Merhige initially believed to be a prank call.) attended by public figures including Annie Leibovitz, Chris Marker, and Phillip Lopate. She became Begotten's leading advocate and was instrumental in setting up its eventual theatrical release. Sontag took a copy to the Berlin International Film Festival in the early to mid – 1990s where she informally screened it to interested cinéastes. During one of her screenings, it was viewed by director Werner Herzog, whom Merhige said was "very supportive of the film".

=== Theatrical screenings ===
Begotten did not secure a limited theatrical release, but over time had gained popularity as an underground film, especially through distribution channels specializing in subversive or transgressive content. Merhige booked one-off screenings at various film festivals and art museums. The earliest screening took place on October 24, 1989 at the Goethe-Institut as part of the Montreal World Film Festival. (Note: Several media outlets have alternately reported the 1990 and 1991 film festival screenings as its first release.) Strong reactions of attendees were reported, as The Gazette described a majority of the audience as "too stunned by what they'd seen to react". After its debut at the 1990 San Francisco International Film Festival, it was shown at the Museum of Modern Art, (Note: Attributed to multiple references:) on October 22 with Merhige introducing the film, followed by a post-screening discussion with the audience. It was shown at multiple film festivals from 1991–1996, these included special screenings at New York City's Film Forum, (Note: Attributed to multiple references:) American Cinematheque, and the Ann Arbor Film Festival.

== Reception ==
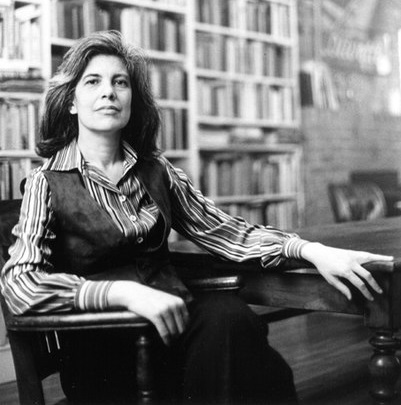
Susan Sontag (pictured in 1979) was one of the main advocates for Begotten and helped ensure the film's release.

Merhige was initially fearful that audiences would misunderstand the film and said that he "felt sure it would be misunderstood and consigned to the underground again. I see it as a very serious, very beautiful work of art, but when it was first finished, I was always thinking, 'What if everybody just laughs? What if they don't see anything in it?' There is always that possibility." Although critical reactions to the film were polarized, Merhige has said that he is grateful for the film helping to start his career.

The few reviews it did attract were mixed to positive. Some critics praised the film's unique visual style and resonating themes, and remarked on its graphic violence. In a positive review, Sontag described it as "a metaphysical splatter film" and "one of the 10 most important films of modern times". In a 1991 review, Joe Kane of the New York Daily News praised the film's minimalist soundtrack, cinematography and subversion of the traditional narrative structure. Newsday's Jon Anderson awarded it his highest score of four stars, lauding what he felt was its deconstruction of the barriers of dream and reality, bestowing additional acclaim towards its exploration of the human condition through its unconventional style. Marc Savlov from the Austin Chronicle called the film "Experimental, haunting, dreamlike, and intentionally confounding", further writing on the film's grainy visual imagery, horrific imagery as having an influence on the VHS sequences in The Ring series, and the works of Guy Maddin. In their annual publication of The Video Movie Guide, the authors Mick Martin and Marsha Porter rated Begotten their highest score of four stars, praising its uniqueness, while commenting that viewers would either 'love or hate it'.

Begotten's narrative and use of symbolism were highlighted by some critics. The Courier commented that the film "goes beyond convention" with its story-telling. Jackson Hole News described the film as 'an accurate portrayal of the religious attitudes and ideas of the Dark Ages'. Jonathan Rosenbaum at the Chicago Reader called it a "remarkable if extremely upsetting" film, applauding the originality of its visuals, but cautioned that its graphic violence was not for the squeamish or the faint of heart. The Christian Science Monitor's, David Sterritt compared it favorably to Samuel Beckett's novel How It Is in regards to its symbolism and narrative structure. Sterritt also commented that the film's claustrophobic atmosphere and dark narrative were hard to stomach but equally entrancing overall.

Although some critics wrote favorable about the film's visual imagery and narrative themes, others criticized its brutal violence and long running time. Awarding it two and a half out of four stars, John Kenneth Muir felt its narrative would be better suited to a short rather than a feature film, despite praising its "originality" and "powerful" imagery. Echoing this sentiment, the Polish journalist Bartłomiej Paszylk thought the first half was compelling and "genuinely frightening", but wrote that the narrative would have been better served with a much shorter length. The film's graphic violence and imagery were criticized by Janet Maslin of The New York Times who described it as "too grotesque" to engage an audience, although she highlighted its unique narrative.

== Post-release ==
=== Home media and bootlegs ===
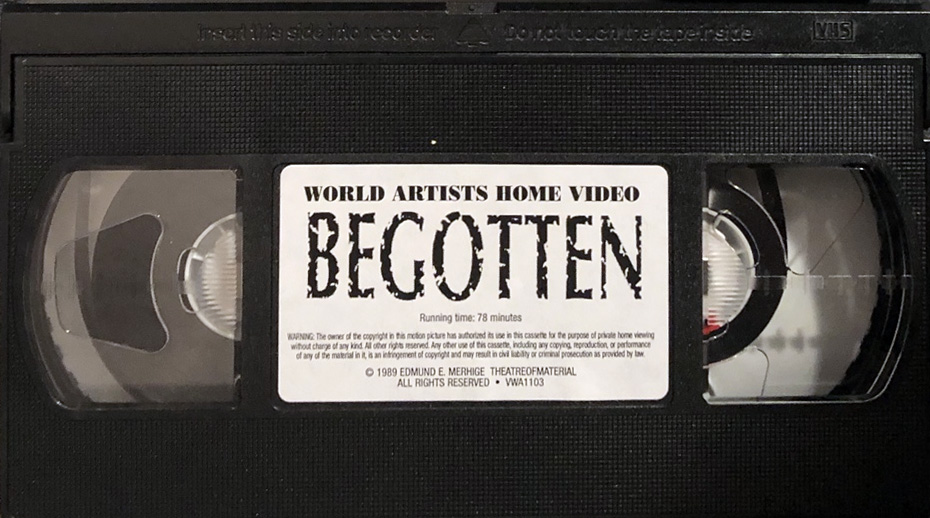
Begotten was released on VHS in 1995. The film is currently out of print, though widely bootlegged.

Begotten was renewed via a limited home media distribution after its theatrical release; Merhig initially disliked the home video format but changed his mind when he realized that the soundtrack could be enhanced through home video. The film was briefly released in 1995 on VHS by World Artists Home Video, (Note: Attributed to multiple references:) and was banned in Singapore due to its graphic content. It was given a limited DVD release by World Artists on February 20, 2001. It included a souvenir booklet, the original theatrical trailer, rare and never-before-seen movie stills and production photos. World Artists' release of the film was listed by Film Comment's Gavin Smith as the ninth of his "Top 10 DVD Picks". However, Merhige has expressed his disappointment with this release, citing poor image resolution.

The film's cult status grew via bootleg copies and later through digital piracy distribution channels (Note: Attributed to multiple references:) which expanded Begotten's availability and exposure. The film was typically encountered via ambiguously legal methods, a situation which—according to Mathijs and Sexton—fostered a "copy-cult" that enhanced its cult status.

On December 8, 2026, it is scheduled for release on Ultra HD Blu-ray by Kino Lorber, as a limited edition. The release will include the 2026 teaser and theatrical trailers, the sequel Polia & Blastema: A Cosmic Opera (2020), and Merhige's short film, Implosion (1983).

=== Later screenings ===
Begotten has appeared at multiple film festivals since the mid-2010s. The first took place in October 2014 at Brooklyn's Spectacle Theater as a part of its annual "Spectober" event. That month, the independent arts venue the Horse Hospital screened the film, accompanied by a live, improvised music score by band The Begotten. It appeared at the third annual horror film festival SpectreFest on October 28, 2015, which was followed by an onstage discussion with Merhige. It was shown at the Music Box Theatre in Midtown Manhattan on September 25, 2016, during its 25th Anniversary celebration, where it was screened from Merhige's personal 16mm print. It was presented as a double-feature alongside the director's other film, Shadow of the Vampire, and followed by a Q&A with Merhige.

The film was screened at the Short Film Festival in London on January 8, 2017, in its original 16mm format, accompanied by a live performance of the score. It was screened on October 17, 2019, at the Rice Media Center, as part of a celebration of "Low-Fi" Analog film series. More recent screenings include on March 29, 2022, at Cinemateca Portuguesa in Lisbon, Portugal, that November at Goldsmiths, University of London and in 2023 at the L'Etrange Festival.

=== Restoration ===
Over the years, Merhige has turned down several offers by film companies to distribute the film, citing cheap and inadequate restoration methods. Restoration attempts began in 2016. In July, Merhige announced a collaboration between the Pennsylvania-based CinemaArts on a 4K restoration to be released on Blu-ray in the fall of that year, coinciding with a 25th-anniversary screening at Music Box Theatre in Manhattan. Describing this restoration process as meticulous and pushing the digital and analog technology to its limits. However, Merhige states that he only intends to release the film once the restoration and upscaling is completed. In 2016, Merhige began work on a remaster of the film for a limited-edition vinyl release set for 2017. Later that year, former March Violets band member-turned-composer Tom Ashton announced that he was working with Merhige on an "audio reimagining" of the soundtrack. There were no new updates on its outcome. In 2026, it was announced that restoration of Begotten was complete and would be screened at multiple film festivals. (Note: Attributed to multiple references:) The restoration was carried out under Merhige's supervision from the original 16mm negative and optical soundtrack, completed through the use of a 35mm optical bench. Final grading and more restorative work was completed by Filmscan in Munich. (Note: Attributed to multiple references:) Reviewing the film for Screen Slate, Emerson Rosenthal opined that, even with the restoration, "the true power of Begotten resides in the fact that, even when you know what you’re looking at, it still lulls you back into the feeling that you might very well be witnessing the origin of the universe."

The restoration premiered at the 53rd Telluride Film Festival, and later at the 2026 Beyond Fest on September 24. (Note: Attributed to multiple references:) A sneak preview, attended by Merhige was shown by Kino Lorber at New York's IFC Center on October 1, followed by full screenings of the film from October 2-8th. (Note: Attributed to multiple references:) It was given a limited theatrical run in select theaters on September 30, with continued screenings announced for October–December of this year. As of November, the release has made a total of $69,713 in the United States.

== Thematic analysis ==
=== Allegory of perception ===
Begotten incorporates concepts such as audience perception and how imagery is interpreted, which Merhige uses to challenge the viewer's interpretation of the film. The cryptic nature of the film's visuals, as Knighton comments, entices viewers to decipher the story and meaning behind Begotten, while also rebuffing such attempts. Knighton further notes that its thematic elements, including the sound and visual aspects, function as an invitation for viewers to participate in narratively 'putting the pieces together'. Carolyn L. Kane, a visual communication's professor at Toronto Metropolitan University, suggests that the degraded image quality of Begotten echoes the works of German photographer Thomas Ruff and the use of image noise. As Kane writes, incorporating such image noise into the film also doubles as an allegory for the viewer's uncertainty, in what she describes as "the hermeneutic of the image".

The narrative structure of Begotten is experimental, often defying the conventions of film narrative. (Note: Attributed to multiple references:) (Note: Additional genre elements, including horror and fantasy, have been noted by some writers.) Scenes are portrayed in a highly visualized style, leaving viewers to interpret and engage with the film individually. Academic William Verrone comments that the experimental storyline invites a more active viewing experience from its audience. Though the narrative of the film subverts traditional storytelling, Merhige states that most viewers have interpreted the film in a way he intended.

=== Cycle of life ===
Begotten, like most of Merhige's films, explores narrative motifs on the cycle of life and death. (Note: Attributed to multiple references:) The word Begotten; a form of the verb beget, meaning to "bring forth", references these themes; Merhige himself has described the characters and events depicted in the film as metaphors for life and the struggle of mankind with itself and nature. Likewise, scholars Penny Papageorgopoulou and Dimitris Charitos highlight the recurrent themes of life, death and rebirth as a metaphor of humanity's antagonistic relationship with nature. Some writers note the connections between the film's depiction of life and death and the cycle of the Earth. John Kenneth Muir defines the mistreatment of the Son of Earth as a symbol to mankind's "painful" toil of the earth to plant crops and the allusion to bringing forth life through great suffering. According to Muir, depictions of life, death and renewal in Begotten are also symbolic motifs of the four seasons.

Reality in Begotten is dominated by a cycle of life and death within a dying world. (Note: Attributed to multiple references:) Its characters wander through a lifeless world of desolate landscapes under an atmosphere of cold indifference to their suffering. Beginning with the disembowelment of a god-like being and the birth of Mother Earth, Paşcalău describes the sequence as "the cyclical nature of life, birth, and death". Death and decay are the dominant forces in Begotten. The Son of Earth's journey through the desert, according to Merhige, depicts a world that is dying and in need of renewal. Death is portrayed in the film as crucial to the restoration of life; god-like beings die or are killed, with their deaths bringing forth new life. At the film's conclusion, life on Earth is renewed through the burial of Mother Earth and her son as flowers grow from their graves.

=== Creation mythology and religious themes ===
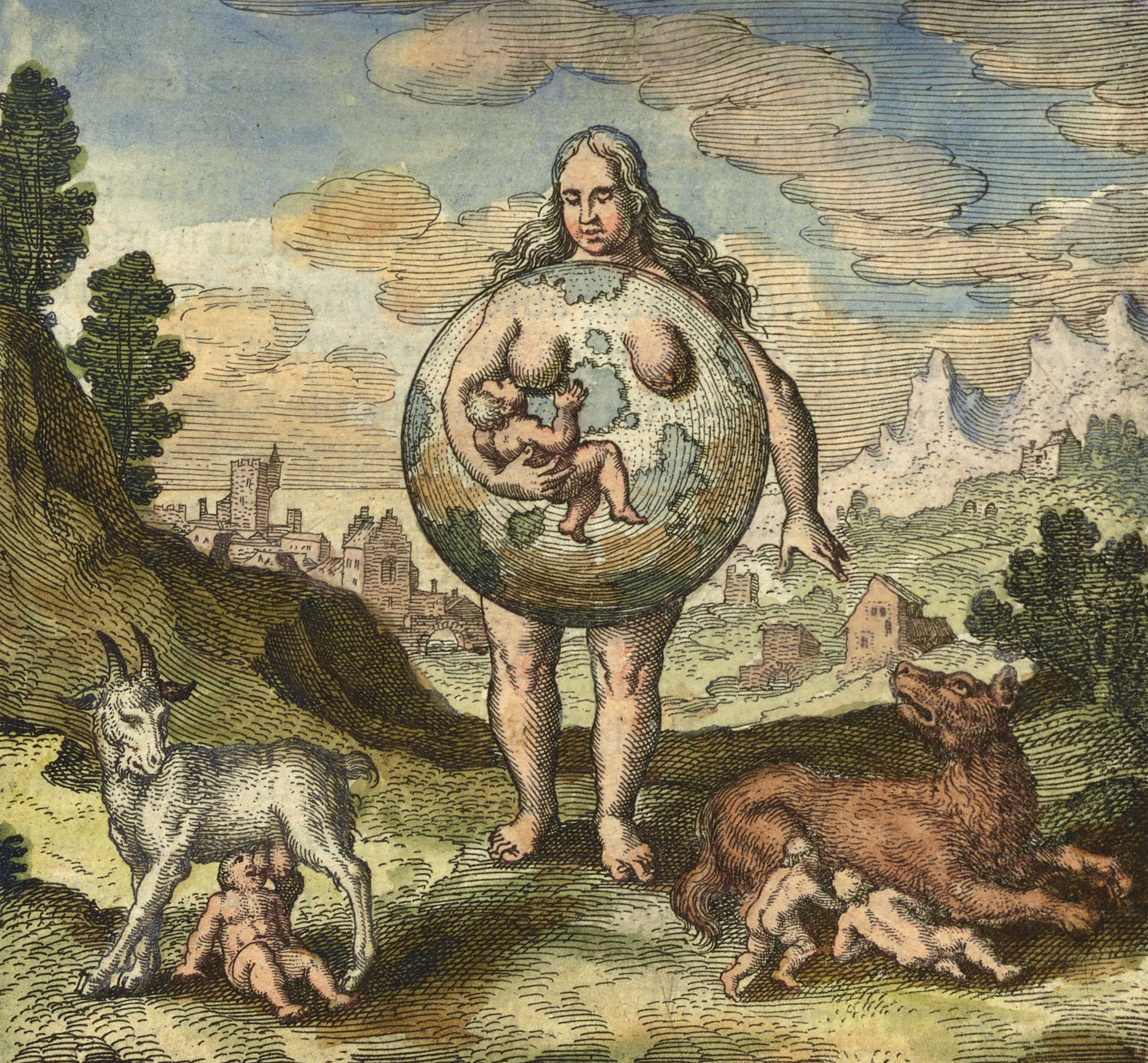
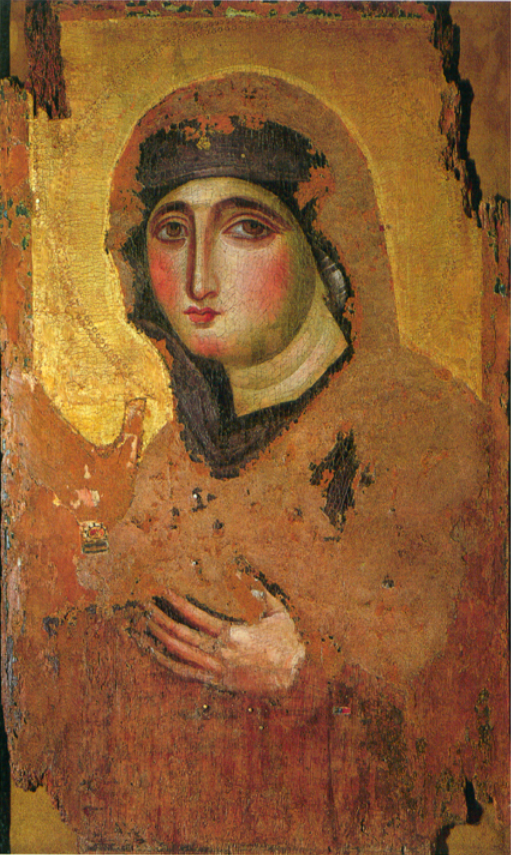
In Begotten, the character Mother Earth is loosely based on the deity of the same name (left) and Mary, mother of Jesus (right).

Begotten's story is built around the idea of creation myths. (Note: Attributed to multiple references:) As Scott MacDonald wrote, the film's plot reflects many contemporary popular attitudes towards the origins of life and religion. Merhige said that he deliberately crafted Begotten to appear as part of a mythology and incorporated mythic and existential themes. Critics have noted a multitude of mythic and religious motifs, including connections to Christianity, Celtic mythology, Druidism, Egyptian Mythology and Slavic paganism.

The opening scenes allude to creation myths such as life reborn from the corpse or dismembered parts of a primordial being. The death of God Killing Himself becomes a form of self-sacrifice as Mother Earth emerges from and impregnates herself with his remains, which Paşcalău notes as a form of divine origin and transcendance. The art historian Herbert S. Lindenberger suggests that the film's narrative is a reworking of early writings on creation mythology published by social anthropologist and folklorist James George Frazer, who intended to shock his readers with what Lindenberger described as "the savagery of their ancestors". As Verrone writes, the storyline was founded on ancient mythologies, recounting the birth of a divine entity and their subsequent suffering, describing the film's premise as "a cryptic passion play about Earth's birth and torture". Marc Savlov echoed this statement and described the plot as an allegory for the death and rebirth of god. Film Comment's Robert DiMatteo comments that a "God's eye" is applied to the film's human characters, with their movement and behavior comparable to insects; they move in "the way [that] ants move when they carry food up a hill".

The main characters are mythic and religious archetypes. Merhige has said that Mother Earth and Son of Earth are partially based on the virgin Mary and Jesus. Some writers have noted similarities between Mother Earth and both the Slavic mother goddess and the universal personification of Mother Nature. Christian motifs are also incorporated into the main characters. (Note: Attributed to multiple references:) Lindenberger has described the motifs as symbolic mirrors to Christianity, with allusions to Mary and Christ and his resurrection. According to Papageorgopoulou and Charitos, the main characters of Begotten are an amalgamation of Christian and Egyptian archetypes As they suggest, traits from the Egyptian gods Osiris, Isis and Horus are ingrained within the characters of God Killing Himself, Mother Earth and Son of Earth, respectively. Additional traits from the Christian concept of God were also listed. Connections to the film and Christian and Egyptian beliefs, according to Papageorgopoulou and Charitos, are viewed through the graphic death of God Killing Himself and the impregnation of Mother Earth are mirrors to the Osiris myth, specifically the disembowelment of Osiris and his wife's impregnation.

Paşcalău identified elements of Buddhism, Hinduism and Jainism within the film. This is especially prevalent in recurrent motifs of death as the catalyst for the birth of new life; a symbol of the interconnected nature of all existence within the Hindu and Jain beliefs, specifically the concept of saṃsāra where all life is trapped in a cycle of reincarnation by karmic attachments. Likewise, the divine suicide of God and the birth of new deities, as Paşcalău states, mirrors the Buddhist teachings on suffering and non-being.

=== Mystic and occult motifs ===
Motifs within the alchemical, gnostic and hermetic traditions permeate Begotten; Mathijs and Sexton note that Merhige "makes perhaps the most serious attempt to visualize elements of Dionysian orgiastic cultism". By the 1980s New Age beliefs and practices including alchemy, western esotericism and hermeticism had grown in prominence. Merhige was a follower of these philosophies, and described Begotten and its creation as an "alchemical process.. [made to] bypass intellectual interpretation". The performances of the cast are ritualistic and symbolic, a trait that Merhige imbued into the film's narrative.

Writing on the spiritual aspects of the film, Papageorgopoulou and Charitos highlight the hermetic and gnostic traditions contained within Begotten. The character Son of Earth, they note, has characteristics of several religious and mystic figures, including the gnostic concept of the Ogdoad or "Begotten One". Film historian Gary D. Rhodes comments that Begotten is the ultimate example of an alchemical film. However, he states that the film was "not cinema about alchemy, but alchemical cinema". The act of creating the film and manipulating the image, "through textural, visual, and photochemical means," according to Rhodes, mirrors the alchemical process of Chrysopoeia (transmutation). Merhige has described the creation of the film's visuals as "akin to alchemical investigation," where his vision for the film involved the distillation of the image into something raw and primal. Each test, according to Merhige, helped him to uncover the visual language for the film as something "elemental and almost otherworldly."

=== The human condition ===
Begotten also enacts several theories described in Nietzsche's 1872 work The Birth of Tragedy. Merhige became aware of Nietzsche's work in his youth and was interested in the concept of tragedy being ingrained within all life. Nietzsche's concept of the struggle between order and chaos, is interspersed throughout the film.

Some writers have described Begotten as a critique of societal norms and the human condition. As Papageorgopoulou and Charitos write, the main characters are given anthromorphic characteristics to evoke sympathy from the audience; these traits, they argue, are the source of persecution by the human characters (Faceless Nomads). The humans in Begotten are symbolic representations of the physical and rational world; the acts of violence on Mother Earth and Son of Earth symbolize the segregation and the antagonistic relationship with humans, animals, and nature. Likewise, humanity as a perpetrator of violence and destruction is also touched upon. According to the writer Jason Wood, the violence in the world of Begotten is the primary "source of horror and decay". In Merhige's view, the world is both ordered and also "suspended in a massive amount of chaos". He said that humanity functions as both a species of order and chaos, having been a force that creates great beauty through innovation and chaos through the destruction of each other and the earth. The academic Cristian Paşcalău wrote that the film utilizes a symbolic narrative to explore the suffering, violence and transformation of humanity.

== Legacy ==
=== Recognition ===
Begotten had a significant impact on Merhige's career. He was hired in the late 1990s by the singer Marilyn Manson to direct music videos for his eponymous band's songs "Antichrist Superstar" and "Cryptorchid", the latter utilizing imagery incorporated from Begotten. (Note: Attributed to multiple references:) Manson was a huge admirer of Begotten, and had the album's art designer P. R. Brown view the film while developing the album's cover art. During pre-production, Manson contacted Merhige to ask if he was willing to direct the video for his song "Cryptorchid". Manson has stated that Begotten was played on a loop during the entire recording for his album Antichrist Superstar. A decade after Begotten's release, Merhige directed Shadow of the Vampire. Nicolas Cage, the co-producer, advocated hiring Merhige to direct the project based on his positive impression of Begotten. (Note: Attributed to multiple references:)

In a 2021 retrospective, Fangoria writer Soham Gadre said that, while Begotten remains a cinematic outsider, it has gradually achieved more exposure and recognition. Critic J. Hoberman states that Merhige created his own genre through the film and described it as "unique — not just nightmarish, but something beyond." Since the start of the 21st century, Begotten has gained more prominence through its availability online and various streaming platforms such as YouTube, helping it accumulate a wider audience. Before its removal of graphic content, clips and photographs from the film began circulating on the blogging platform Tumblr and later on TikTok, exposing it to a new generation of fans. It has gradually developed a cult following (Note: Attributed to multiple references:) and is described by some writers as the director's masterpiece. It was listed in the 2011 book 100 Cult Films by the academic Ernest Mathijs and filmmaker Xavier Mendik over Mendik's objections, who felt that its following was too small to merit inclusion. However, it was ultimately included, to Mathijs, the film's following represented "the real sectarian cult; it's a very small committed group of people. It's like a secret handshake that goes worldwide. If you've seen Begotten, you're in that cult."

Though initially mixed in his response to the film, Muir has since described Begotten as "one of the most disturbing films ever made". Industry professionals such as the writer and photographer Chris Marker, actor Elijah Wood, director-screenwriter Eli Roth, and film editor Dennis Jakob have expressed their admiration for the film. (Note: Attributed to multiple references:) Natalia Keogan of Paste described the film as one of the best and the most unsettling avant-garde films. In his 2014 book Disorders of Magnitude: A Survey of Dark Fantasy, the author Jason V. Brock wrote that Begotten was his seventh favorite work of radio, film, or television production. Review aggregation website Rotten Tomatoes, which has compiled old and contemporary reviews, reports that 79% of 14 critics provided positive reviews for the film, with an average rating of 6.40/10.

Several publications selected it as one of the most disturbing films of all time, including Highsnobiety (2016), Entertainment Weekly (2017), and NME (2023). Similarly, Begotten has been ranked in several top film lists, including number four by Joblo.com (2012) and Nylon (2017); number twenty by GamesRadar+ in 2018; and number twenty-three by Complex Magazine in 2021. Over the years, several sources have erroneously reported Time as placing Begotten in its top-ten list of either 1990 or 1991, but the film was not included in either year. (Note: Some media outlets have claimed that Time listed Begotten among the best films of 1990. Los Angeles Times and the film's DVD packaging claimed it had been listed in 1991.)

=== Influence ===
Begotten has influenced several avant-garde and experimental films and is cited as an inspiration by several artists. Michael Pope's 2001 experimental film Neovoxer has been compared to Begotten as it contains a similar visual style and "impressionistic mythology". According to Panos Cosmatos, the flashback sequences in his 2010 film Beyond the Black Rainbow were directly inspired by Begotten. When interviewed by the critic Joshua Miller, Cosmatos said that he wanted the sequences to "have the look and feel of an artifact that was in the process of deterioration" and that Begotten's visual style was the perfect look for these sequences. Eddie Alcazar's 2016 short film FUCKKKYOUUU was noted by the magazine Vice as possibly influenced by Merhige's film. Jimmy Joe Roche's experimental short film, Skin of Man (2018), was also said to have been influenced by Begotten.

Critics have described some films as a visual throwback to Begotten, including Baskin (2015), Ville Marie (2015), Flesh of the Void (2017), (Note: Director James Quinn has stated that he felt the film did not fall into the same category as Begotten.) and Prototype (2018). (Note: Attributed to multiple references:)

Many music artists have expressed admiration for the film and have cited its influence on their work. In 1997, the Swedish heavy metal band Katatonia used a film still of Begotten for their album, Sounds of Decay. In an interview with webzine Chronicles of Chaos, band member Jonas Renkse recalled the idea behind the inclusion of the image came out during a conversation with a member of the record label Avantgarde Music. The doom metal band Begotten derive their name from film. In the promotional video for their 2001 song "Sterile Nails and Thunderbowels", the Swedish black metal band Silencer used clips from Begotten interspersed with original footage. The American music artist Zola Jesus listed the film as a major inspiration for her 2017 music album Okovi, stating in an interview with ARTnews that during the development of the album, she played the film on loop to help with Okovi's audio and visual aesthetic. For their experimental musical composition Frankenstein Bemshi! at the 2018 Rochester Fringe Festival, the performers Dave Esposito and G. E. Schwartz mixed portions of Begotten with the 1910 film Frankenstein, accompanied by live guitar music, electronic soundscapes, spoken narration and poetry added as text to the movie's image.

== Sequels ==
Begotten was the first in a trilogy known as "The Begotten Cycle", the two sequels are short films written and directed by Merhige that further explore creation myths and mysticism. (Note: Attributed to multiple references:) The first sequel Din of Celestial Birds combines the theories of the Big Bang and evolution; The short premiered at the Telluride Film Festival on September 6, 2006, and was described by Merhige as a depiction of "creation in its simplest and purest form".

Polia & Blastema: A Cosmic Opera (alternately titled Polia & Blastema: A Metaphysical Fable) incorporates gnosticism into the fantasy and science fiction genre and concludes the trilogy. Funded through a Kickstarter campaign, it was a collaborative effort between Merhige, Wexler and the musician Gavin Gamboa. It premiered at the Opera Philadelphia's Opera on Film Festival on September 30, 2022. The entire "Begotten Cycle" was screened as a single film at 2023 L'Etrange Festival in September.

== Works cited ==
=== Books ===
- Aldama, Frederick; Lindenberger, Herbert (February 2, 2016). Aesthetics of Discomfort: Conversations on Disquieting Art. University of Michigan Press. ISBN 978-0-4720-5300-1 – via Google Books.
- Bleiler, David, ed. (October 24, 2003). "Begotten (1989, 78 min, US, E. Elias Merhige)". TLA Video & DVD Guide 2004: The Discerning Film Lover's Guide. St. Martin's Press. p. 50. ISBN 978-0-3123-1686-0 – via Google Books.
- Brock, Jason (July 17, 2014). "Appendix B: Select Radio, Film and Television Productions". Disorders of Magnitude: A Survey of Dark Fantasy. Rowman & Littlefield. p. 300. ISBN 978-1-4422-3525-0 – via Google Books.
- Digitalis, Raven (August 31, 2008). Shadow Magick Compendium: Exploring Darker Aspects of Magickal Spirituality. Llewellyn Worldwid. ISBN 978-0-7387-1318-2.
- Edwards, Matthew (July 24, 2007). "Close to the Bone: An Interview with Paul Hills". Film Out of Bounds: Essays and Interviews on Non-Mainstream Cinema Worldwide. McFarland & Company, Inc. p. 20. ISBN 978-0-7864-2970-7 – via Google Books.
- Hall, Phil (November 25, 2004). The Encyclopedia of Underground Movies: Films from the Fringes of Cinema. Michael Wiese Productions. ISBN 978-0-9411-8895-1 – via Google Books (snippet view only).
- Hanegraaff, Wouter (November 20, 1997). New Age Religion and Western Culture: Esotericism in the Mirror of Secular Thought. State University of New York Press. ISBN 978-1-4384-0565-0. Archived from the original on March 11, 2023 – via Google Books.
- Hanegraaff, Wouter (February 28, 2013). Western Esotericism: A Guide for the Perplexed (reprint ed.). Bloomsbury Academic. ISBN 978-1-4411-8713-0 – via Google Books.
- Hanson, Peter (June 28, 2010). The Cinema of Generation X: A Critical Study of Films and Directors. McFarland & Company, Inc. ISBN 978-0-7864-8078-4 – via Google Books.
- Hoberman, J. (January 1, 2003). The Magic Hour: Film at Fin de Siècle. Temple University Press. ISBN 978-1-5663-9995-1 – via Google Books.
- Jones, David (November 14, 2018). Re-envisaging the First Age of Cinematic Horror, 1896-1934: Quanta of Fear. University of Wales Press. ISBN 978-1-7868-3336-5 – via Google Books.
- Kane, Carolyn (December 17, 2019). High-Tech Trash: Glitch, Noise, and Aesthetic Failure. University of California Press. ISBN 978-0-5203-4014-5 – via Google Books.
- Lentz, Harris (January 1, 1994). Science Fiction, Horror & Fantasy Film and Television Credits: Supplement 2, through 1993. Vol. 4. McFarland & Company, Inc. ISBN 978-0-8995-0927-3 – via Google Books (snippet view only).
- Leonard, Scott; McClure, Michael (February 18, 2003). Myth and Knowing: An Introduction to World Mythology. McGraw-Hill. ISBN 978-0-7674-1957-4 – via Google Books (snippet view only).
- MacDonald, Scott (March 30, 1998). "Elias Merhige (on Begotten)". A Critical Cinema 3: Interviews with Independent Filmmakers. University of California Press. pp. 284–292. ISBN 978-0-5202-0943-5 – via the Internet Archive (registration required).
- Markham-Smith, Ian; Hodgson, Liz (April 30, 2001). Nicolas Cage: The Unauthorised Biography. Blake Publishing. ISBN 978-1-85782-396-7.
- Martin, Mick; Porter, Marsha (October 7, 1997). The Video Movie Guide 1998. Ballantine Books. ISBN 978-0-3454-0793-1 – via Google Books (snippet view only).
- Massaccesi, Cristina (December 1, 2015). "Appendix: Interview with E. Elias Merhige". Nosferatu: A Symphony of Horror. Columbia University Press. pp. 113–120. ISBN 978-0-9932-3846-8 – via Google Books.
- Mathijs, Ernest; Sexton, Jamie (May 2, 2011). Cult Cinema: An Introduction. John Wiley & Sons. ISBN 978-1-4051-7374-2 – via Google Books.
- Mathijs, Ernest (October 23, 2017). "Begotten, E. Elias Merhige, 1991". In Mathijs, Ernest; Mendik, Xavier (eds.). 100 Cult Films. Bloomsbury Publishing. pp. 20–21. ISBN 978-1-8445-7571-8 – via Google Books.
- Muir, John (October 6, 2011). Horror Films of the 1990s. McFarland & Company, Inc. pp. 140–142. ISBN 978-0-7864-4012-2 – via Google Books.
- Muir, John (March 22, 2023). Horror Films of 2000-2009. McFarland & Company, Inc. p. 92. ISBN 978-1-4766-4450-9 – via Google Books.
- Newman, Kim (April 26, 2002). Science Fiction/Horror: A Sight and Sound Reader. British Film Institute. ISBN 978-0-8517-0896-6 – via Google Books.
- Papageorgopoulou, Penny; Charitos, Dimitris (December 21, 2023). "From Anthropocene to Cthulucene: The Biomythography of Begotten". In Buran, Sümeyra; Akşehir, Mahinur; Köroğlu, Neslihan; Ağır, Barış (eds.). Shades of Violence: Multidisciplinary Reflections on Violence in Literature, Culture and Arts. Transnational Press London. ISBN 978-1-8013-5149-2 – via Google Books.
- Paszylk, Bartłomiej (June 8, 2009). "Part V: The New Weirdnesss – Begotten (1991)". The Pleasure and Pain of Cult Horror Films: An Historical Survey. McFarland & Company, Inc. pp. 190–191. ISBN 978-0-7864-3695-8 – via Google Books.
- Perron, Wendy (November 5, 2013). "The Power of Stripping Down Nightmares". Through the Eyes of a Dancer: Selected Writings (2nd ed.). Wesleyan University Press. ISBN 978-0-8195-7409-1 – via Google Books.
- Prince, Stephen (March 15, 2002). "Elias Merhige". A New Pot of Gold: Hollywood Under the Electronic Rainbow, 1980–1989. History of the American Cinema. Vol. 10 (1st ed.). University of California Press. pp. 437–438. ISBN 0-520-23266-6 – via the Internet Archive (registration required).
- Quigley, Eileen, ed. (January 1, 2007). International Television & Video Almanac (78 ed.). Quigley Publishing Company. ISBN 978-0-9006-1081-3 – via Google Books.
- Shaw, Andrea (April 9, 1996). Seen That, Now What?: The Ultimate Guide to Finding the Video You Really Want to Watch. Simon and Schuster. ISBN 978-0-6848-0011-0 – via Google Books.
- Stephanou, Aspasia (May 13, 2019). Inhuman Materiality in Gothic Media. Routledge. ISBN 978-1-3153-9572-2 – via Google Books.
- Stockley, Ed, ed. (January 1, 1999). Cinematographers, Production Designers, Costume Designers & Film Editors Guide (7th ed.). Lone Eagle. ISBN 978-1-5806-5017-5 – via Google Books.
- Tucker, Betty (December 1, 2001). Confessions of a Movie Addict. Hats Office. ISBN 978-1-58736-085-5 – via Google Books.
- Verrone, William (November 8, 2012). The Avant-Garde Feature Film: A Critical History. McFarland & Company, Inc. ISBN 978-0-7864-5910-0 – via Google Books.
- Whelan, Andrew (June 15, 2015). "Power electronics and conventionally transgressive assembly work". In Wilson, Scott (ed.). Music at the Extremes: Essays on Sounds Outside the Mainstream. McFarland & Company, Inc. ISBN 978-1-4766-2006-0 – via Google Books.
- Willis, John (February 1, 2000). Screen World: 1992. Vol. 43. Crown Publishing Group. p. . ISBN 978-1-5578-3135-4 – via the Internet Archive (registration required).
- Wood, Jason (2002). "E. Elias Merhige". In Allon, Yoram; Cullen, Del; Patterson, Hannah (eds.). Contemporary North American Film Directors: A Wallflower Critical Guide (2nd ed.). Wallflower Press. p. 374. ISBN 978-1-9033-6452-9 – via the Internet Archive (registration required).

=== Newspapers ===
- Anderson, John (June 5, 1991). "Distorting Both Dreams and Reality". Newsday (Nassau Edition). Hempstead, New York: Newsday Media. pp. 63, 66. Archived from the original on November 16, 2023 – via Newspapers.com (subscription required).
- Beckermann, Jim (January 21, 2001). "A Cult Film Director Gets a Chance". The Record. p. 185. Archived from the original on April 19, 2021 – via Newspapers.com (subscription required).
- Beifuss, John (March 9, 2001). "Horror to the Max: Nosferatu, Begotten". The Bradenton Herald. The McClatchy Company. p. 80. Archived from the original on November 16, 2023 – via Newspapers.com (subscription required).
- Bowman, Jon (March 22, 1991). "New this Week: Begotten". The Santa Fe New Mexican. The New Mexican, Inc. p. 41. Archived from the original on December 18, 2025 – via Newspapers.com (subscription required).
- Cornell, Christopher (March 19, 1995). "Home Entertainment: Pianist profile, Italy tour top latest video releases". The Fort Myers News-Press. Gannett. p. 85. Archived from the original on November 15, 2021 – via Newspapers.com.
- Dutka, Eleaine (August 26, 2004a). "When evil is on the prowl". Los Angeles Times. p. 51. Archived from the original on April 26, 2021 – via Newspapers.com (subscription required).
- Dutka, Elaine (September 8, 2004b). "Exploring the Abyss". South Florida Sun-Sentinel. p. 67. Archived from the original on April 26, 2021 – via Newspapers.com.
- Garcia, Chris (January 25, 2001). "Nosferatu, with angst". Austin American-Statesman. p. 22. Archived from the original on December 26, 2024 – via Newspapers.com.
- Griffin, John (October 26, 1989). "High definition is becoming horror show for organizers". Montreal Gazette. Montreal: Postmedia Network. p. 64. Archived from the original on October 22, 2019 – via Newspapers.com (subscription required).
- Griffin, John (October 28, 1989). "On-Screen nightmares match those in the projection booth". The Gazette. Postmedia Network. p. 82. Archived from the original on May 25, 2025 – via Newspapers.com.
- Hart, John (March 10, 1995). "Several movies bypass theaters in March". The Akron Beacon Journal. p. 80. Archived from the original on October 24, 2019 – via Newspapers.com (subscription required).
- Hartl, John (March 10, 1995). "Several Movies Bypass theaters in March". The Akron Beacon Journal. Akron, Ohio. p. 80. Archived from the original on November 16, 2023 – via Newspapers.com (subscription required).
- Kane, Joe (June 5, 1991). "Begotten tribe does the rite thing". Extra (Entertainment). New York Daily News. p. 39. Archived from the original on March 17, 2020 – via Newspapers.com.
- Malcolm, Paul (August 11, 1994). "Pick of the Week: Begotten". LA Weekly. p. 43. Archived from the original on December 18, 2019 – via Newspapers.com (subscription required).
- "Film & Video Events". LA Weekly. November 21, 1996. p. 84. Archived from the original on December 11, 2024.
- Parker, Melody (October 7, 1999). "The Weird, the Wacky star at Hearst film fest". The Waterloo-Cedar Falls Courier. Lee Enterprises. p. 44. Archived from the original on December 11, 2024 – via Newspapers.com.
- Potter, Christopher (November 10, 1995). "After The Begotten Ann Arbor Film Co-op may fade to black". The Ann Arbor News. Advance Magazine Publishers. p. 19. Archived from the original on August 16, 2025 – via Newspapers.com.
- "Complete Lineup for the San Francisco International Film Festival". San Francisco Examiner. April 29, 1990. pp. 20–21. Archived from the original on November 15, 2021 – via Newspapers.com.
- Simon, Jeff (January 21, 2001). "Out of the Shadows Director Elias Merhige Emerges from Hollywood's Dungeon Bloody but Unbowed". Buffalo News. pp. 1, 5. Archived from the original on November 15, 2021.
- Sims, Robert (January 31, 2001). "Director E. Elias Merhige discusses his film Shadow of a Vampire, which delves into the making of a vampire movie with a real vampire". Palm Beach Daily News. Gannett. p. 8. Archived from the original on December 26, 2024 – via Newspapers.com.
- Sullivan, Jim (January 27, 2001). "Dark Shadows". Anchorage Daily News. Binkley Co. pp. 33–34. Archived from the original on December 26, 2024 – via Newspapers.com.
- Swift, David (August 9, 1995). "Thou Shalt Not Hack". Jackson Hole News. p. 74. Archived from the original on December 11, 2024 – via Newspapers.com.
- Thomas, Kevin (November 18, 1996). "Hitchcock's British Strangers to Open". The Los Angeles Times. p. 75. Archived from the original on December 14, 2024 – via Newspapers.com.
- Uricchio, Marylynn (March 15, 1994). "Writers fete The Piano, Schindler's". Pittsburgh Post-Gazette. p. 26. Archived from the original on December 11, 2024 – via Newspapers.com.
- Vari, Michael (February 5, 2001). "Vampire director Merhige no longer a fringe player". Chicago Tribune. Tribune Publishing. p. 43. Archived from the original on December 17, 2023 – via Newspapers.com.

=== Media ===
- E. Elias Merhige (April 6, 2010) [May 2006]. Remote Viewing: A Filmmaker's Journey into the Dramatic Structure of the Mind (DVD). International Remote Viewing Association. ASIN B000X9K20G – via Internet Archive.
- Merhige, Edmund (July 9, 2016). "E. Elias Merhige - Filmmaker (Begotten, Shadow of the Vampire)" (Podcast). The Justin Beahm Radio Hour. No. 1. Interviewed by Beahm, Justin. Reverend Entertainment. Archived from the original on June 10, 2025 – via Apple Podcasts.
- E. Elias Merhige, Elena Lazic (March 25, 2023). E. Elias Merhige masterclass (Videotape). Interviewed by Lazic, Elena. Offscreen Film Festival. Archived from the original on February 7, 2025 – via YouTube.
- Mendonça, Luis (March 29, 2022). Cinematica Portuguesa – Museu Do Cinema Susan Sontag– Imagens de Pensamento [Cinemateca Portuguesa – Cinema Museum Susan Sontag – Images of Thought] (pdf) (Program pamphlet) (in Portuguese). Cinemateca Portuguesa. Archived (PDF) from the original on September 9, 2023.
- E. Elias Merhige (Director) (1989). Begotten (Motion picture). United States: Theatreofmaterial.
- Merhige, Edmund (January 1, 1990). "Begotten press kit" (press kit). San Francisco International Film Festival. pp. 1–8.
- E. Elias Merhige (June 9, 2016). Stateless: E. Elias Merhige (Videotape). MLB Advanced Media. Archived from the original on December 23, 2025 – via MLB.com.
- "Twenty-Third Season of CineProbe Begins" (PDF) (Museum pamphlet). Museum of Modern Art. Department of Public Information. August 1990. Archived (PDF) from the original on November 15, 2021.
- "Fall Film Highlights" (PDF) (Museum pamphlet). Museum of Modern Art. Department of Public Information. September 1990. Archived (PDF) from the original on January 9, 2025.
- 30th Telluride Film Festival Guide (pdf) (Program pamphlet). Telluride Film Festival. August 2006. p. 30. Archived (PDF) from the original on November 3, 2021.
- Begotten (pdf) (DVD booklet). World Artists Home Video. February 20, 2001 – via the Internet Archive.

=== Periodicals ===
- Atkinson, Michael (November–December 2000). "Vampire Variations". Film Comment. Vol. 36, no. 6. Film at Lincoln Center. pp. 27–29. JSTOR 43455859.
- Beahm, Justin (September 30, 2013). "Begotten Son: Filmmaker E. Elias Merhige Challenged and Confounded with His Chillingly Allegorical First Feature". Fangoria. No. 326. United States: Cinestate. pp. 32–34.
- Corliss, Richard (May 13, 1991). "A Happy Birthday for the Kids of Kane". Time (subscription required). Vol. 137, no. 19. p. 69. Archived from the original on August 28, 2013.
- DiMatteo, Robert (January–February 1991). "Future Primeval". Film Comment. Vol. 27, no. 1. Film at Lincoln Center. p. 2. JSTOR 43453866.
- Dubner, Stephen (October 22, 1990). "Movies: Theater Guide". New York. Vol. 23, no. 41. p. 158. ISSN 0028-7369 – via Google Books.
- Hart, Paul (Spring 1992). "Begotten". Propaganda. No. 18. pp. 38–40 – via the Internet Archive.
- Paşcalău, Cristian (December 2023). "Representations of Non-Being in David Lynch's Eraserhead, Edmund Elias Merhige's Begotten, and Darren Aronofsky's Pi: A Comparative Analysis from Indian Philosophy Perspectives". American, British and Canadian Studies Journal. 41 (1). Sciendo: 162–185. doi:10.2478/abcsj-2023-0024. ISSN 1841-1487. Archived from the original on June 8, 2025.
- Schrift, Alan (2006). "Deleuze Becoming Nietzsche Becoming Spinoza Becoming Deleuze: Toward a Politics of Immanence". Philosophy Today. Dispossession and Discordance: Currents in Continental Philosophy. 50 (23). DePaul University: 187–194. doi:10.5840/philtoday200650Supplement23. ISSN 0031-8256. Archived from the original on June 8, 2025.
- Smith, Gavin (January–February 2001). "Vidi Vidi Vidi". Film Comment. Vol. 37, no. 1. Film at Lincoln Center. pp. 78–79. JSTOR 43824819.
- Sterritt, David (November 27, 1990). "The Best of Independent Films Are There If You Look for Them". The Christian Science Monitor. p. 11. Archived from the original on October 3, 2015.
- ——— (2000). "Film Reviews: Shadow of the Vampire". Cinéaste. Vol. 25, no. 4. pp. 34–35. JSTOR 41689288.
