= 100 Cult Films =

2011 non-fiction book

- Author: Ernest Mathijs; Xavier Mendik
- Language: English
- Series: BFI Screen Guides
- Subject: Film
- Published: 2011 (British Film Institute)
- Publication place: England
- Media type: Print (Paperback)
- Pages: 256
- ISBN: 978-184457-408-7

100 Cult Films is a 2011 book written by Ernest Mathijs and Xavier Mendik, who selected one hundred cult films to discuss.

== Process ==
The two authors often disagreed with each other and were forced to make concessions; for example, Mathijs opposed the inclusion of Cannibal Holocaust, which he called an initiation ritual and not a film with a devoted cult following. He relented and allowed its inclusion so that he could convince Mendik to include Begotten. Mathijs wanted to include The Princess Bride, but Mendik preferred to focus on including more transgressive films, and it was not included. As a result of its choices, the book attracted controversy from cult film fans.

To choose the final film, the authors performed a public survey; the resulting winner was In Bruges. A mobile app was released to allow readers to mark each of the films that they have seen. The app features appearances by Eli Roth and Joe Dante.

== See also ==
- 2011 in film
- Midnight film
- Extreme cinema
