= Cine-Excess =

UK film festival

- Location: Birmingham
- Founded: 2007
- Hosted by: Xavier Mendik
- Language: English
- Website: www.cine-excess.co.uk

The Cine-Excess International Film Festival and Convention is a UK film festival about cult films that features a themed conference, open discussions, and screenings. It was founded by Xavier Mendik and has been held in several English cities. As of 2013, it takes place in Birmingham. It caters to mainstream audiences, academics, and film industry professionals.

== History ==
Cine-Excess was originally part of the 2007 Sci-Fi-London film festival and was spun off in 2008 due to its popularity. Mendik describes it as a "mainstream festival" and says was designed to break down barriers between academics and audiences. In the introduction to their book The Cult Film Reader, Mendik and Ernest Mathijs said that it celebrates the mixing of academics and industry professionals, bringing together theory and practice. Andrea Hubert of The Guardian described it as a "unique, eclectic festival which celebrates paracinema and transgressive film-making like no other." In 2013, the festival moved to Birmingham. It was held 15–17 November. Lifetime Achievement awards have been given to Roger Corman, Dario Argento, and Joe Dante.

Special screenings have included The Movie Orgy in 2010, Cannibal Holocaust in 2011, and A Gun for Jennifer and Society in 2013.

Cine-Excess has partnered with Nouveaux Pictures to release high definition versions of cult films. Releases so far include Amsterdamned, Suspiria, and Viva.

== See also ==
- List of fantastic and horror film festivals
