= E. Elias Merhige =

American filmmaker (born 1964)

- Born: Edmund Elias Merhige; 1964 (age 61–62); Brooklyn, New York City, U.S.
- Occupations: Film director; theatre director; screenwriter
- Years active: c. 1982–present
- Spouse: Nadja Merhige

Edmund Elias Merhige (/ˈmɛrɪdʒ/; born 1964) is an American film director.

== Career ==
Merhige is best known for his work on the 2000 film Shadow of the Vampire and to underground audiences for the cult 1989 film Begotten. He has also directed music videos for Marilyn Manson.

Merhige started in the New York theatre scene, and first conceived Begotten as a work of experimental theatre, casting many actors from his company in supporting roles. Following the release of his last feature film Suspect Zero, Merhige has mostly returned to work in the theatre.

== Critical reception ==
Eugene Thacker, writing about Begotten, placed Merhige's work "between genre horror and performance art," marking Begotten as a "ritual in cinematic time," and concluding that the next step in Merhige's art offering "presumably, would be to allow everything to dissolve - human into non-human, body into environment, image into emulsions of gelatin, crystal, and camphor."

== Filmography ==
Short films

Year	Title	Director	Writer	Producer	Notes
1983	Implosion	Yes	Yes	No	
1984	Spring Reign	Yes	No	No	
1985	A Taste of Youth	Yes	No	No	
2006	Din of Celestial Birds	Yes	Yes	Yes	Also cinematographer
2022	Polia & Blastema: A Cosmic Opera	Yes	No	No	

Feature films

Year	Title	Director	Producer	Writer	Notes
1989	Begotten	Yes	Yes	Yes	Also cinematographer and special effects
2000	Shadow of the Vampire	Yes	No	No	
2004	Suspect Zero	Yes	Yes	No	

Music videos

Year	Title	Artist
1996	"Antichrist Superstar"	Marilyn Manson
1996	"Serpentia"	Danzig
1996	"Cryptorchid"	Marilyn Manson
2007	"The Heinrich Maneuver"	Interpol
