= Mendik =

Mendik may refer to:

Surname:

- Bernard H. Mendik (1929-2001), American real estate developer
- Xavier Mendik (born 1967), English documentary filmmaker

Other:

- Folle blanche, French grape variety
