= The Cult Film Reader =

2008 book edited by Ernest Mathijs and Xavier Mendik

- Editors: Ernest Mathijs; Xavier Mendik
- Language: English
- Subject: Motion Pictures – History
- Published: 2008 (Open University Press)
- Publication place: England
- Media type: Print (Hardcover)
- Pages: 554
- ISBN: 978-0-335-21924-7

The Cult Film Reader is a 2008 book edited by Ernest Mathijs and Xavier Mendik. It collects essays by Susan Sontag, Umberto Eco, and others, each on the topic of cult followings, cult films, and related topics. Director and producer Roger Corman wrote the introduction.

== Reception ==
Stacey Abbott of Science Fiction Film and Television wrote, "The chapters are all well written and rigorously argued by leading scholars in the field. By pulling all of this work together in The Cult Film Reader, the editors have produced an invaluable collection for anyone researching or teaching cult cinema." Greg Walker of the Times Higher Education wrote that it "offers a rich prospectus for the scope of the genre and makes a strong case for its further study." David Church of Film Quarterly wrote, "Despite its mostly minor flaws, The Cult Film Reader as a whole encompasses many of the key trends in cult film studies, making it a highly valuable resource."
