= Cult following =

Group of fans who are highly dedicated to a specific area of culture

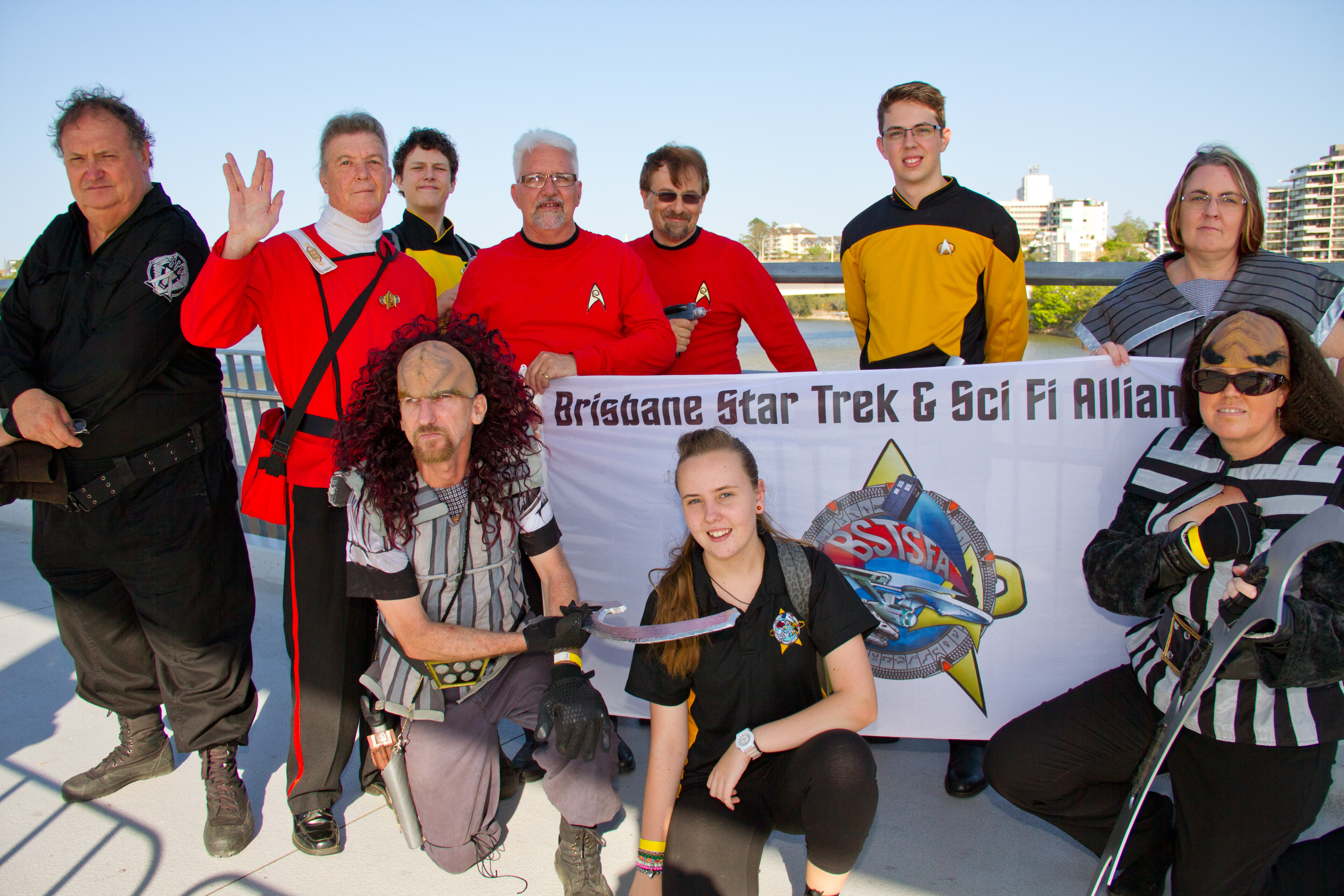
Trekkies at a Brisbane on Parade event. Star Trek enthusiasts are one of the best-known examples of a pop culture franchise having a cult following.

A cult following is a group of fans who are highly dedicated to a person, idea, object, movement, or work, often an artist, in particular a performing artist, or an artwork in some medium. The latter is often called a cult classic. A film, book, musical artist, internet personality, television series, or video game, among other things, is said to have a cult following when it has a very passionate fanbase.

A common component of cult followings is the emotional attachment the fans have to the object of the cult following, often identifying themselves and other fans as members of a community. Cult followings are also commonly associated with niche markets. Cult media are often associated with underground culture, and are considered too eccentric or anti-establishment to be appreciated by the general public or to be widely commercially successful.

Many cult fans express their devotion with a level of irony when describing such entertainment. Fans may become involved in a subculture of fandom, either via conventions, online communities or through activities such as writing series-related fiction, costume creation, replica prop and model building, or creating their own audio or video productions from the formats and characters.

== Film ==
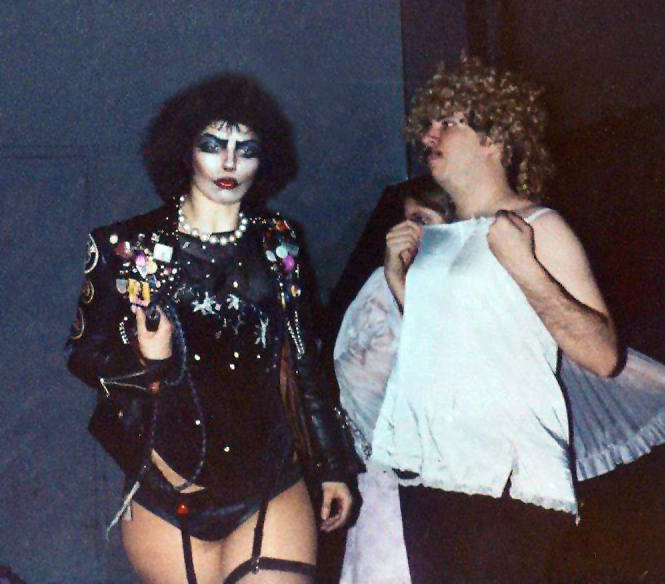
The cult following for The Rocky Horror Picture Show emerged through its promotion as a midnight movie.

There is not always a clear difference between cult and mainstream media. Professors Xavier Mendik and Ernest Mathijs, authors of 100 Cult Films, argue that the devoted following among these films make them cult classics. In many cases, films that have cult followings may have been financial flops during their theatrical box office run, and even received mixed or mostly negative reviews by mainstream media, but are still considered a major success by small core groups or communities of fans.

Some cults are only popular within a certain subculture. The film Woodstock (1970) is especially loved within the hippie subculture, while Hocus Pocus (1993) holds cult status among American women born in the 1980s and early 1990s. Certain mainstream icons can become cult icons in a different context for certain people. Reefer Madness (1936) was originally intended to warn youth against the use of marijuana, but because of its ridiculous plot, overwhelming number of factual errors and cheap look, it became watched by audiences of marijuana smokers and has gained a cult following.

Quentin Tarantino's films borrow stylistically from classic cult films, but are appreciated by a large audience; therefore, Tarantino's filmography is noted worldwide as lying somewhere between cult and mainstream cinema. Also, certain cult phenomena can grow to such proportions that they become mainstream, such as the filmography of cult directors like John Waters, John Sayles, John Cassavetes, Armando Bó, Eliseo Subiela, Ruggero Deodato, Takeshi Kitano, Abbas Kiarostami or Jesús Franco.

== Television ==
Certain television series develop a cult following after their cancellation, which may cause interest in renewal. Arrested Development, which was cancelled in 2006 after its third season, was renewed by Netflix in 2013 and received two additional seasons. Futurama was cancelled in 2003 after its fourth season on Fox, but was later picked up by Comedy Central for an additional three seasons. In 2022, it was announced the series would be renewed for 20 additional episodes (released weekly) on the streaming service Hulu. Star Trek was cancelled after three seasons, but in broadcast syndication it gained a more substantial following, ultimately spawning a successful media franchise.

David Lynch's Twin Peaks ran on ABC for two seasons from 1990 to 1991, initially garnering high ratings and critical acclaim. Ratings and reception declined following ABC's demand that the show reveal the core mystery of Laura Palmer's murderer, the revelation of which was not ever intended to be revealed in the show by Lynch and co-creator Mark Frost. Eventually, the show was canceled, ending on a cliffhanger. It was not until 2017 that Twin Peaks returned as a limited series on Showtime, ending one of the longest hiatuses in television history.

Series often considered cult classics include the long-running BBC science fiction series Doctor Who, the ITV sci-fi thriller series The Prisoner, the Australian soap opera Prisoner: Cell Block H, the Indian soap opera that ran for eight years Kasautii Zindagii Kay, the mock animated talk show Space Ghost Coast to Coast aired on Cartoon Network (which then spawned many spin-offs and other shows that had a similar sense of humor as Space Ghost Coast to Coast when Adult Swim became a block on the network), and the animated television show My Little Pony: Friendship Is Magic (which spawned a large fanbase of adult viewers called bronies).

== Video games ==
Some video games, often those with unique concepts that fail to gain traction with the mainstream audience, attract cult followings and can influence the design of later video games. An example of a cult video game is Ico (2001), an initial commercial flop that gained a large following for its unique gameplay and minimalist aesthetics, and was noted as influencing the design of Brothers: A Tale of Two Sons (2013) and Rime (2017), among other games. Other games that have cult followings include EarthBound (1994), another unsuccessful game that later resulted in the creation of a "cottage industry" selling memorabilia to the EarthBound fandom; Conker's Bad Fur Day (2001), an unusually mature 3D platform game for the Nintendo 64 celebrated for its dark humor and story; Yume Nikki (2004), a surreal free-to-play Japanese horror game; Psychonauts (2005), an initially unsuccessful platformer that has consistently kept one of the strongest fan followings; Hitman: Blood Money (2006), considered to many long-time fans of the Hitman franchise to be the first and last great Hitman game, despite its outdated controls and gameplay, and not receiving deserved acclaim at the time; Alan Wake (2010), an action-adventure game whose story is modeled similar to a thriller television series format and has gained loyal followings despite its underselling; Spec Ops: The Line (2012), a critically acclaimed third-person shooter known for its portrayal of the "horrors of war" and the deep psychological impact of armed conflict on soldiers; Grand Prix Legends (1998), a realistic and unforgiving racing simulation of the 1967 Formula One season; and Dwarf Fortress (2006), a construction and management simulation and roguelike indie video game known for its cuboidal-grid world model and sometimes difficult text-based interface, rich and complex simulation gameplay, similarly rich procedural world generation and history of continuous development by a small team which continues as of 2026.The 07th Expansion games have been assessed as some of the most influential cult-classic visual novels of all time.

== Music ==
One of the earliest cult classics in rock was The Velvet Underground's 1967 debut album, The Velvet Underground & Nico. While hugely influential, it originally flopped commercially and alienated radio stations, music retailers, and magazines, who found the content too controversial to market. Over the next decade, it received greater recognition from rock critics, who helped make the album more popular. The Beatles' self-titled album, known as The White Album, at first received mixed reviews from music critics who considered its satirical songs unimportant and apolitical amid the turbulent political and social climate of 1968; it later attracted acclaim, and has since become a cult classic. The Zombies' 1968 album Odessey and Oracle was also originally a critical and commercial flop, failing to chart despite its single "Time of the Season" becoming a surprise hit the following year. While the Zombies disbanded just before its release, the album's status grew as a cult classic in the following decades. David Bowie's 1970 album The Man Who Sold the World also did not impact the record charts on its original release while receiving mixed reviews from critics. After Bowie achieved mainstream success in the early 1970s, its 1972 reissue reached number 24 on the UK Albums Chart, but only 105 in the US. The Man Who Sold the World's influence on future musicians, such as The Cure, Siouxsie and the Banshees, and Gary Numan, as well as the dark wave genre, lent it a cult following in the music scene.

Punk rock has produced several albums with cult followings. The Ramones' 1976 self-titled debut album sold poorly, but was hugely influential on the then-young punk movement, and eventually sold well enough to earn a gold sales certification in 2014. The British post-punk band Magazine also released their debut, Real Life (1978), to little popular success, reaching only number 29 in the UK. Its subsequent acclaim as an innovative and influential work in the burgeoning post-punk genre earned it a reputation as a cult classic. In 1982, the American hardcore punk band Bad Brains released their self-titled debut exclusively on cassette, struggling to gain an audience in the vinyl-dominated marketplace. The appearance of the single "Pay to Cum" on the compilation album Let Them Eat Jellybeans! (1981) helped Bad Brains develop a following in the UK, while the album's musical innovation and growing influence later ensured it a cult-classic status among followers of hardcore punk.

Some alternative albums have also developed cult followings. The American industrial rock band Nine Inch Nails released their 1989 debut Pretty Hate Machine to modest success on the Billboard 200, peaking at number 75. It developed an underground popularity in subsequent years and sold enough to receive a platinum RIAA certification in 1995, becoming one of the first independently released albums to accomplish the feat. Also in 1989, Nirvana's debut album Bleach was released to some positive notice from critics, but failed to impact record charts, until the band's massively successful 1991 album Nevermind drew further interest to it.

The R&B singer Bilal's second album, Love for Sale, became a cult classic after leaking in 2006 and being notoriously shelved by Interscope Records. The musically experimental album quickly developed a following and acclaim online, becoming what The Village Voice writer Craig D. Lindsey called "the black-music equivalent of Fiona Apple's once-shelved (and also notoriously bootlegged) album Extraordinary Machine".

Japanese dub and dream pop band Fishmans gained a dedicated online cult following after the death of frontman Shinji Sato via word-of-mouth spread on imageboard and music forum sites throughout the 2000s and 2010s.

== Advertising ==
Brands can also attain a cult following, sometimes due to prestige like Apple and Supreme, while others like Spam do so for cultural reasons. There are also many cult car brands ranging from Trabant to Volvo and even specific models like the Fiat 500, Ford Crown Victoria and Toyota AE86 have all spawned dedicated followings within the car enthusiast community.

In September 2021, AMC Theatres began airing a commercial starring actress Nicole Kidman in its theaters and on television. The commercial became a surprise hit among audiences, who came to appreciate the unintentional campiness of its earnestly rhapsodic style and script, particularly the line "Somehow, heartbreak feels good in a place like this." It has inspired internet memes, parodies, and in-theatre audience participation rituals.

== See also ==
- Cult of personality
- Cult wine
- List of cult films
- Sleeper hit
