= Ernest Mathijs =

Canadian professor and author (born 1968/69)

- Born: 1968 or 1969 (age 56–57); Belgium
- Occupation(s): Professor, author
- Known for: Cult film studies

Ernest Mathijs (born 1968 or 1969) is a professor at the University of British Columbia, where he teaches film. He has published several books on cult films.

== Career ==
According to CTV News, his "specialties include movie audiences, the reception of alternative cinema and cult film." Mathijs is primarily known for his books on cult films, such as The Cult Film Reader and 100 Cult Films, which he co-edited and co-wrote, respectively, with Xavier Mendik; Cult Cinema, which he co-wrote with Jamie Sexton; The Cinema of David Cronenberg: From Baron of Blood to Cultural Hero and John Fawcett's Ginger Snaps. With Sexton, he is the co-editor of the Cultographies series, which examines individual cult films in the form of short books.

== Personal life ==
Mathijs was formerly married to Canadian actress Emily Perkins. He was born in Belgium.

== Bibliography ==
- Mathijs, Ernest (2002). "Big Brother and Critical Discourse: the Reception of Big Brother Belgium". Television & New Media. 3 (3): 311–322. doi:10.1177/152747640200300306. ISSN 1527-4764. S2CID 145165823.
- Mathijs, Ernest (2003). "AIDS References in the Critical Reception of David Cronenberg: It May Not Be Such a Bad Disease after All". Cinema Journal. 42 (4): 29–45. doi:10.1353/cj.2003.0019. JSTOR 1566526. S2CID 192144392.
- Mathijs, Ernest, ed. (2004). The Cinema of the Low Countries. London: Wallflower Press. ISBN 978-1-904764-01-4.
- Mathijs, Ernest; Mendik, Xavier, eds. (2004). Alternative Europe; European Exploitation and Underground Cinema Since 1945. London: Wallflower Press. ISBN 978-1-903364-93-2.
- Mathijs, Ernest; Jones, Janet, eds. (2004). Big Brother International: Format, Critics and Publics. London: Wallflower Press. ISBN 978-1-904764-19-9.
- Mathijs, Ernest (2005). "Bad Reputations: the Reception of Trash Cinema". Screen. 46 (4): 451–472. doi:10.1093/screen/hjh083. ISSN 0036-9543.
- Barker, Martin; Mathijs, Ernest; Mendik, Xavier Mendik (2006). "Menstrual Monsters: The Reception of the Ginger Snaps Cult Horror Franchise". Film International. 21 (3, 4): 68–77. doi:10.1386/fiin.4.3.68. ISSN 1651-6826.
- Mathijs, Ernest; Pomerance, Murray, eds. (2006). From Hobbits to Hollywood: Essays on Peter Jackson's Lord of the Rings. New York and Amsterdam: Rodopi. ISBN 978-90-420-1682-8.
- Mathijs, Ernest, ed. (2006). The Lord of the Rings: Popular Culture in Global Context. London: Wallflower Press. ISBN 978-1-904764-83-0.
- Barker, Martin; Mathijs, Ernest (2007). Watching The Lord of the Rings: Tolkien's World Audiences. New York: Peter Lang. ISBN 978-0-8204-6397-1.
- Mathijs, Ernest; Mendik, Xavier, eds. (2008). The Cult Film Reader. London and New York: Open University Press. ISBN 978-0-335-21924-7.
- Mathijs, Ernest (2008). The Cinema of David Cronenberg: From Baron of Blood to Cultural Hero. London: Wallflower Press. ISBN 978-1-905674-66-4.
- Mathijs, Ernest; Sexton, Jamie Sexton (2011). Cult Cinema. Oxford and Boston: Wiley-Blackwell. ISBN 978-1-4051-7374-2.
- Mathijs, Ernest; Mendik, Xavier (2011). 100 Cult Films. London: British Film Institute and Palgrave-Macmillan. ISBN 9781844574087.
- Mathijs, Ernest (2011). "Referential Acting and the Ensemble Cast". Screen. 52 (1): 89–96. doi:10.1093/screen/hjq063. ISSN 0036-9543.
- Mathijs, Ernest (2013). John Fawcett's Ginger Snaps. Toronto: University of Toronto Press. ISBN 9781442615670.
