= Xavier Mendik =

English academic and author

- Born: 1969 (age 56–57); Birmingham, Warwickshire, England
- Occupations: Documentary filmmaker, professor, author, festival director
- Known for: Cult film studies
- Mendik's voice recorded January 2016

Xavier Charles Mendik is an English documentary filmmaker, author, and festival director. He is an associate professor in film and director of graduate studies in the School of Media at Birmingham City University, and formerly at the University of Brighton. He also runs the Cult Film Archive and is the director of Cine-Excess International Film Festival.

== Early life ==
Mendik was born in Birmingham, England, UK.

== Career ==
Mendik teaches at Birmingham City University. He runs Cine-Excess and maintains the Cult Film Archive, a large repository of cult films. At Brunel University, he taught classes on "Buffy studies" and other cult media properties.

Along with Ernest Mathijs, Mendik is the author of 100 Cult Films, a project of the British Film Institute. The book attracted controversy for its selections. With Mathijs, he also co-edited The Cult Film Reader.

== Bibliography ==
- Mendik, Xavier (2000). Dario Argento's Tenebrae. Trowbridge: Flick Books. ISBN 9781862360228.
- Mendik, Xavier; Harper, Graeme (2000). Unruly Pleasures: the Cult Film and Its Critics. Guildford: FAB press. ISBN 9781903254004.
- Mendik, Xavier; Schneider, Steven Jay, eds. (2002). Underground USA: Filmmaking Beyond the Hollywood Canon. London: Wallflower Press. ISBN 978-0-231-16279-1.
- Mendik, Xavier, ed. (2002). Shocking Cinema of the Seventies. Hereford: Noir Publishing. ISBN 9780953656448.
- Mathijs, Ernest; Mendik, Xavier, eds. (2004). Alternative Europe; European Exploitation and Underground Cinema Since 1945. London: Wallflower Press. ISBN 978-1-903364-93-2.
- Mathijs, Ernest; Mendik, Xavier, eds. (2008). The Cult Film Reader. London and New York: Open University Press. ISBN 978-0-335-21924-7.
- Mathijs, Ernest; Mendik, Xavier (2011). 100 Cult Films. London: British Film Institute and Palgrave-Macmillan. ISBN 9781844574087.
