= Cult film =

Films with a devoted fanbase

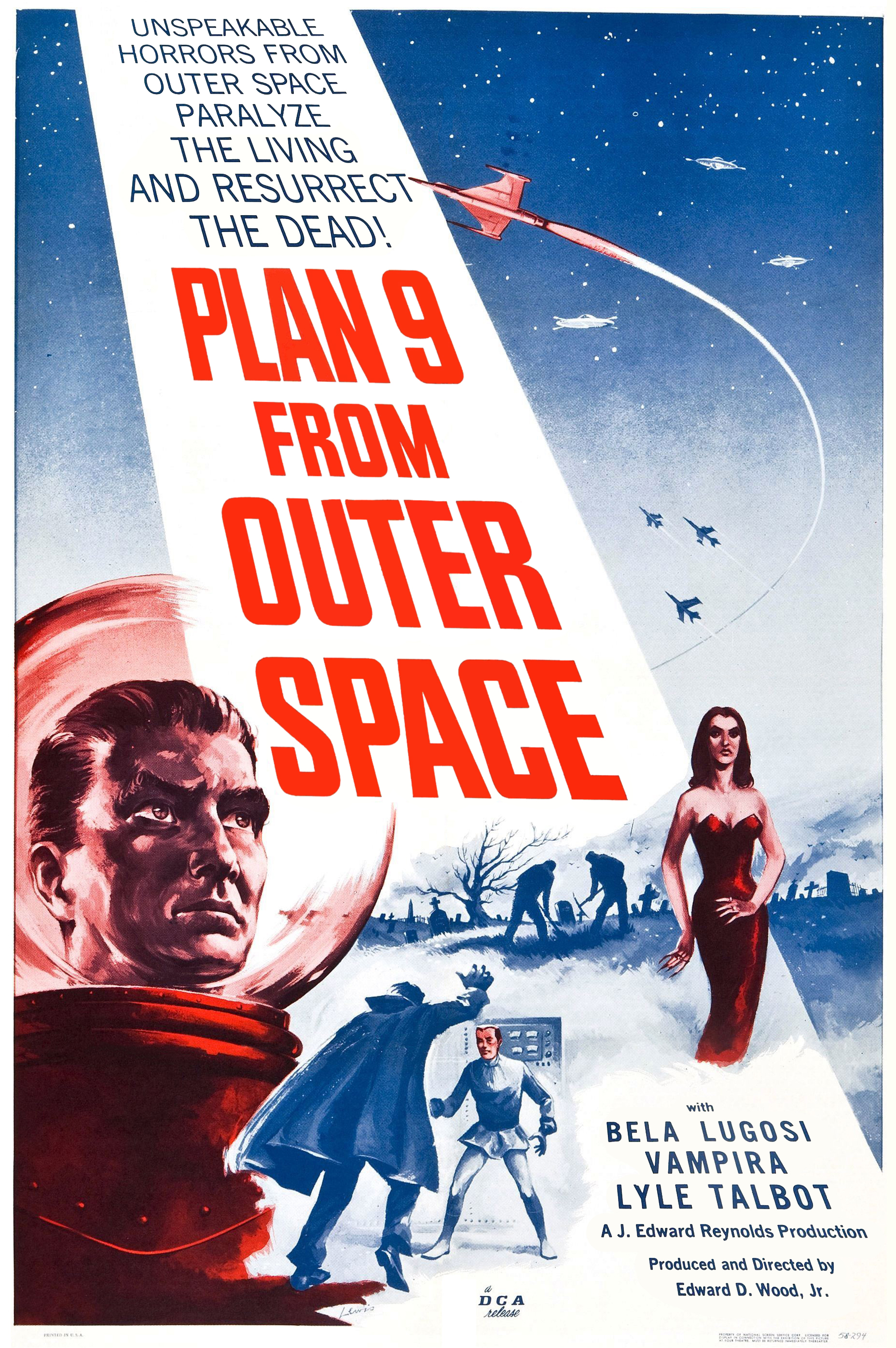
Plan 9 from Outer Space is a popular example of a cult film.

A cult film, also commonly referred to as a cult classic, is a film that has acquired a cult following. Cult films are known for their dedicated, passionate fanbase, which forms an elaborate subculture, members of which engage in repeated viewings, dialogue-quoting, and audience participation. Inclusive definitions allow for major studio productions, especially box-office bombs, while exclusive definitions focus more on obscure, transgressive films shunned by the mainstream. The difficulty in defining the term and subjectivity of what qualifies as a cult film mirror classificatory disputes about art. The term cult film itself was first used in the 1970s to describe the culture that surrounded underground films and midnight movies, though cult was in common use in film analysis for decades prior to that.

Cult films trace their origin back to controversial and suppressed films kept alive by dedicated fans. In some cases, reclaimed or rediscovered films have acquired cult followings decades after their original release, occasionally for their camp value. Other cult films have since become well-respected or reassessed as classics; there is debate as to whether these popular and accepted films are still cult films. After failing at the cinema, some cult films have become regular fixtures on cable television or profitable sellers on home video. Others have inspired their own film festivals. Cult films can both appeal to specific subcultures and form their own subcultures. Other media that reference cult films can easily identify which demographics they desire to attract and offer savvy fans an opportunity to demonstrate their knowledge.

Cult films frequently break cultural taboos, and many feature excessive displays of violence, gore, sexuality, profanity, or combinations thereof. This can lead to controversy, censorship, and outright bans; less transgressive films may attract similar amounts of controversy when critics call them frivolous or incompetent. Films that fail to attract requisite amounts of controversy may face resistance when labeled as cult films. Mainstream films and big budget blockbusters have attracted cult followings similar to more underground and lesser known films; fans of these films often emphasize the films' niche appeal and reject the more popular aspects. Fans who like the films for the wrong reasons, such as perceived elements that represent mainstream appeal and marketing, will often be ostracized or ridiculed. Likewise, fans who stray from accepted subcultural scripts may experience similar rejection.

Since the late 1970s, cult films have become increasingly popular. Films that once would have been limited to obscure cult followings are now capable of breaking into the mainstream, and showings of cult films have proved to be a profitable business venture. Overly broad usage of the term has resulted in controversy, as purists state it has become a meaningless descriptor applied to any film that is the slightest bit weird or unconventional; others accuse Hollywood studios of trying to artificially create cult films or use the term as a marketing tactic. Modern films are frequently stated to be an "instant cult classic", occasionally before they are released. Some films have acquired massive, quick cult followings, owing to advertisements and posts made by fans spreading virally through social media. Easy access to cult films via video on demand and peer-to-peer file sharing has led some critics to pronounce the death of cult films.

== Definition ==
A cult film is any film that has a cult following, although the term is not easily defined and can be applied to a wide variety of films. Some definitions exclude films that have been released by major studios or have big budgets, that try specifically to become cult films, or become accepted by mainstream audiences and critics. Despite this, many heavily canonized films, such as the works of Orson Welles, Francis Ford Coppola, Michael Curtiz, and George Lucas are or were once considered cult films. Cult films are defined by audience reaction as much as by their content. This may take the form of elaborate and ritualized audience participation, film festivals, or cosplay. Over time, the definition has become more vague and inclusive as it drifts away from earlier, stricter views. Increasing use of the term by mainstream publications has resulted in controversy, as cinephiles argue that the term has become meaningless or "elastic, a catchall for anything slightly maverick or strange". Academic Mark Shiel has criticized the term itself as being a weak concept, reliant on subjectivity; different groups can interpret films in their own terms. According to feminist scholar Joanne Hollows, this subjectivity causes films with large female cult followings to be perceived as too mainstream and not transgressive enough to qualify as a cult film. Academic Mike Chopra‑Gant says that cult films become decontextualized when studied as a group, and Shiel criticizes this recontextualization as cultural commodification.

In 2008, Cineaste asked a range of academics for their definition of a cult film. Several defined cult films primarily in terms of their opposition to mainstream films and conformism, explicitly requiring a transgressive element, though others disputed the transgressive potential, given the demographic appeal to conventional moviegoers and mainstreaming of cult films. Jeffrey Andrew Weinstock instead called them mainstream films with transgressive elements. Most definitions also required a strong community aspect, such as obsessed fans or ritualistic behavior. Citing misuse of the term, Mikel J. Koven took a self-described hard-line stance that rejected definitions that use any other criteria. Matt Hills instead stressed the need for an open-ended definition rooted in structuration, where the film and the audience reaction are interrelated and neither is prioritized. Ernest Mathijs focused on the accidental nature of cult followings, arguing that cult film fans consider themselves too savvy to be marketed to, while Jonathan Rosenbaum rejected the continued existence of cult films and called the term a marketing buzzword. Mathijs suggests that cult films help to understand ambiguity and incompleteness in life given the difficulty in even defining the term. That cult films can have opposing qualities – such as good and bad, failure and success, innovative and retro – helps to illustrate that art is subjective and never self-evident. This ambiguity leads critics of postmodernism to accuse cult films of being beyond criticism, as the emphasis is now on personal interpretation rather than critical analysis or metanarratives. These inherent dichotomies can lead audiences to be split between ironic and earnest fans.

Writing in Defining Cult Movies, Jancovich et al. quote academic Jeffrey Sconce, who defines cult films in terms of paracinema, marginal films that exist outside critical and cultural acceptance in such varied genres as exploitation, beach party musicals, and softcore pornography. However, they reject cult films as having a single unifying feature; instead, they state that cult films are united in their "subcultural ideology" and opposition to mainstream tastes, itself a vague and undefinable term. Cult followings themselves can range from adoration to contempt, and they have little in common except for their celebration of nonconformity – even the bad films ridiculed by fans are artistically nonconformist, albeit unintentionally. At the same time, they state that bourgeois, masculine tastes are frequently reinforced, which makes cult films more of an internal conflict within the bourgeoisie, rather than a rebellion against it. This results in an anti-academic bias despite the use of formal methodologies, such as defamiliarization. This contradiction exists in many subcultures, especially those dependent on defining themselves in terms of opposition to the mainstream. This nonconformity is eventually co-opted by the dominant forces, such as Hollywood, and marketed to the mainstream. Academic Xavier Mendik proposes that films can become cult by virtue of their genre or content, especially if it is transgressive. Due to their rejection of mainstream appeal, Mendik says cult films can be more creative and political; times of relative political instability produce more interesting films.

== General overview ==
Cult films have existed since the early days of cinema. Film critic Harry Alan Potamkin traces them back to 1910s France and the reception of Pearl White, William S. Hart, and Charlie Chaplin, which he described as "a dissent from the popular ritual". Nosferatu (1922) was an unauthorized adaptation of Bram Stoker's Dracula. Stoker's widow sued the production company, and all known copies in Germany were destroyed. Now illegal to distribute in many countries, Nosferatu became an early cult film. Academic Chuck Kleinhans identifies the Marx Brothers as making other early cult films. On their original release, some highly regarded classics from the Golden Age of Hollywood were panned by critics and audiences, relegated to cult status. The Night of the Hunter (1955) was a cult film for years, quoted often and championed by fans, before it was reassessed as an important and influential classic. During this time, American exploitation films and imported European art films were marketed similarly. Although critics Pauline Kael and Arthur Knight argued against arbitrary divisions into high and low culture, American films settled into rigid genres; European art films continued to push the boundaries of simple definitions, and these exploitative art films and artistic exploitation films influenced American cult films. Much like later cult films, these early exploitation films encouraged audience participation, influenced by live theater and vaudeville.

Modern cult films grew from 1960s counterculture and underground films, popular among those who rejected mainstream Hollywood films. These underground film festivals led to the creation of midnight movies, which attracted cult followings. The term cult film itself was an outgrowth of this movement and was first used in the 1970s, though cult had been in use for decades in film analysis with both positive and negative connotations. These films were more concerned with cultural significance than the social justice sought by earlier avant-garde films. Midnight movies became more popular and mainstream by the 1970s, peaking with the release of The Rocky Horror Picture Show (1975), which finally found its audience several years after its release. Eventually, the rise of home video marginalized midnight movies once again, after which many directors joined the burgeoning independent film scene or went back underground. Home video gave a second life to box-office flops, as positive word-of-mouth or excessive replay on cable television led these films to develop an appreciative audience, as well as obsessive replay and study. For example, The Beastmaster (1982), despite its failure at the box office, became one of the most played films on American cable television and developed into a cult film. Home video and television broadcasts of cult films were initially greeted with hostility. Joanne Hollows states that they were seen as turning cult films mainstream – in effect, feminizing them by opening them to distracted, passive audiences.

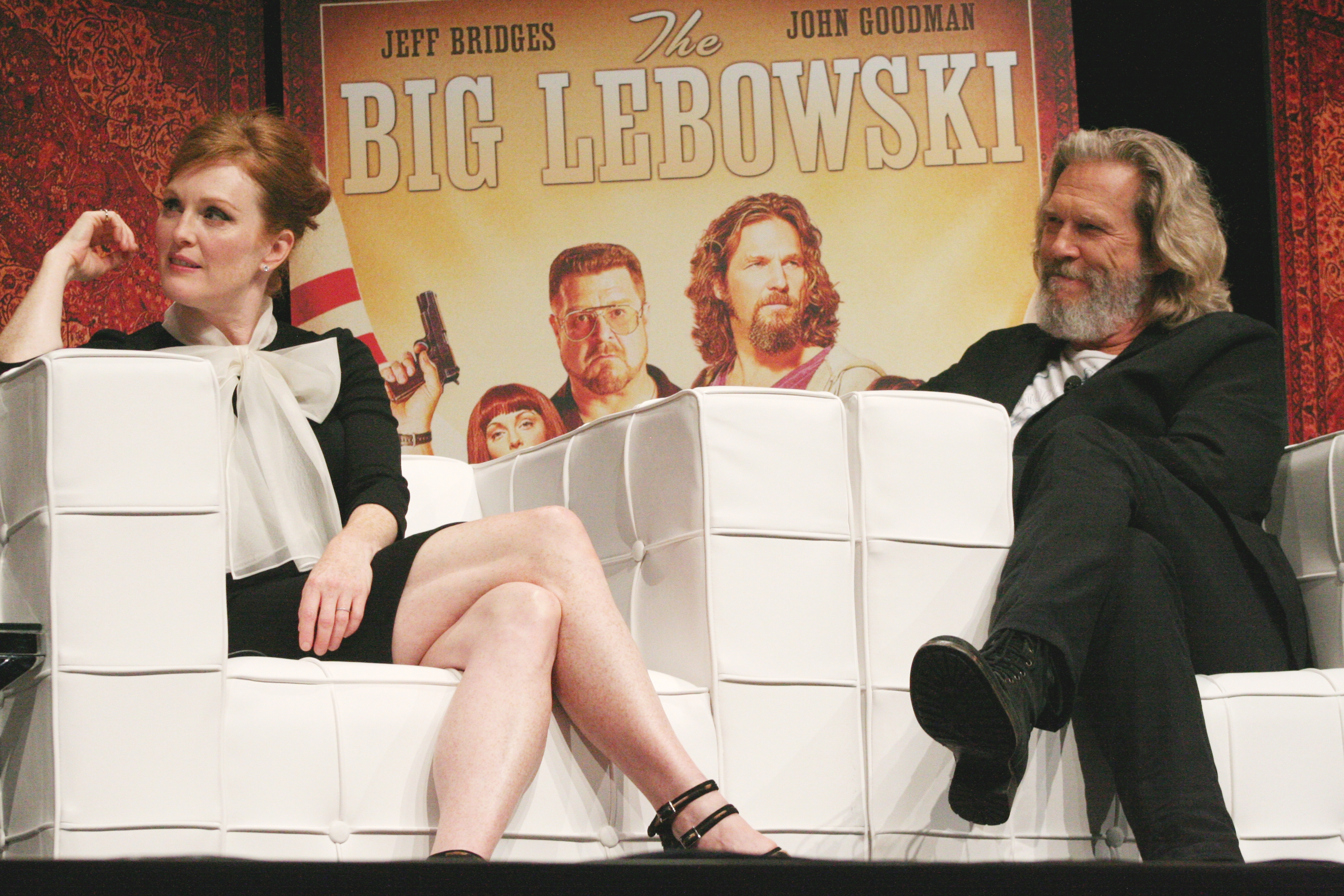
Julianne Moore and Jeff Bridges at Lebowski Fest 2011

Releases from major studios, such as The Big Lebowski (1998), which was distributed by Universal Studios, can become cult films when they fail at the box office and develop a cult following through reissues, such as midnight movies, festivals, and home video. Hollywood films, due to their nature, are more likely to attract this kind of attention, which leads to a mainstreaming effect of cult culture. With major studios behind them, even financially unsuccessful films can be re-released multiple times to seek an audience. The constant use of profanity and drugs in otherwise mainstream, Hollywood films, such as The Big Lebowski, can alienate critics and audiences yet lead to a large cult following among more open-minded demographics not often associated with cult films, such as Wall Street bankers and professional soldiers. Thus, even comparatively mainstream films can satisfy the traditional demands of a cult film, perceived by fans as transgressive, niche, and uncommercial. Discussing his reputation for making cult films, Bollywood director Anurag Kashyap said, "I didn't set out to make cult films. I wanted to make box-office hits." Academics Ernest Mathijs and Jamie Sexton state that this acceptance of mainstream culture and commercialism is not out of character, as cult audiences have a more complex relationship to these concepts: their opposition is to mainstream values and excessive commercialism.

In a global context, popularity can vary widely by territory, especially with regard to limited releases. Mad Max (1979) was an international hit, except in America where it became an obscure cult favorite, ignored by critics and available for years only in a dubbed version though it earned over $100M internationally. Foreign cinema can put a different spin on popular genres, such as Japanese horror, which was initially a cult favorite in America. Asian imports to the West are often marketed as exotic cult films and of interchangeable national identity. Foreign influence can affect fan response, especially on genres tied to a national identity; when they become more global in scope, questions of authenticity may arise. Filmmakers and films ignored in their own country can become the objects of cult adoration in another, producing perplexed reactions in their native country. Cult films can also establish an early viability for more mainstream films, both for filmmakers and national cinema. The early cult horror films of Peter Jackson were so strongly associated with his homeland that they affected the international reputation of New Zealand and its cinema. As more artistic films emerged, New Zealand was perceived as a legitimate competitor to Hollywood, which mirrored Jackson's career trajectory. Heavenly Creatures (1994) acquired its own cult following, became a part of New Zealand's national identity, and paved the way for big-budget, Hollywood-style epics, such as Jackson's The Lord of the Rings trilogy.

Cult film fans often watch films obsessively or in idiosyncratic ways, such as speeding them up or slowing them down. Fans may watch marathons of horror films on Halloween, sentimental melodrama on Christmas, and romantic films on Valentine's Day. Christmas films in particular have a nostalgic factor. These films, ritually watched every season, give a sense of community and shared nostalgia. New films often have trouble making inroads against the institutions of It's a Wonderful Life (1946) and Miracle on 34th Street (1947). These films provide mild criticism of consumerism while encouraging family values. Halloween, on the other hand, allows for flaunting society's taboos and testing one's fears via horror films. Mathijs criticizes the commercialized nature of Halloween and horror films, which he states feels lacks community. Mathijs states that Halloween horror conventions can provide the missing community aspect.

Despite their oppositional nature, cult films can produce celebrities. Like cult films themselves, authenticity is an important aspect of their popularity. Actors can become typecast as they become strongly associated with such iconic roles. Tim Curry, despite his acknowledged range as an actor, found casting difficult after he achieved fame in The Rocky Horror Picture Show. Even when discussing unrelated projects, interviewers frequently bring up the role, which causes him to tire of discussing it. Mary Woronov, known for her transgressive roles in cult films, eventually transitioned to mainstream films. She was expected to recreate the transgressive elements of her cult films within the confines of mainstream cinema. Instead of the complex gender deconstructions of her Andy Warhol films, she became typecast as a lesbian or domineering woman. Sylvia Kristel, after starring in Emmanuelle (1974), found herself highly associated with the film and the sexual liberation of the 1970s. Caught between the transgressive elements of her cult film and the mainstream appeal of soft-core pornography, she was unable to work in anything but exploitation films and Emmanuelle sequels. Despite her immense popularity and cult following, she rated only a footnote in most histories of European cinema if she was even mentioned. Similarly, Chloë Sevigny has struggled with her reputation as a cult independent film star famous for her daring roles in transgressive films. Cult films can also trap directors. Leonard Kastle, who directed The Honeymoon Killers (1969), never directed another film again. Despite his cult following, which included François Truffaut, he was unable to find financing for any of his other screenplays. Qualities that bring cult films to prominence – such as an uncompromising, unorthodox vision – caused Alejandro Jodorowsky to languish in obscurity for years.

== Transgression and censorship ==
Transgressive films as a distinct artistic movement began in the 1970s. Unconcerned with genre distinctions, they drew inspiration equally from the nonconformity of European art cinema and experimental film, the gritty subject matter of Italian neorealism, and the shocking images of 1960s exploitation. Some used hardcore pornography and horror, occasionally at the same time. In the 1980s, filmmaker Nick Zedd identified this movement as the Cinema of Transgression and wrote a manifesto. Popular in midnight showings, they were mainly limited to large urban areas, which led academic Joan Hawkins to label them as "downtown culture". These films acquired a legendary reputation as they were discussed and debated in alternative weeklies, such as The Village Voice. Home video finally allowed general audiences to see them, which gave many people their first taste of underground film. Mathijs says that cult films often disrupt viewer expectations, such as giving characters transgressive motivations or focusing attention on elements outside the film. Cult films can also transgress national stereotypes and genre conventions, such as Battle Royale (2000), which broke many rules of teenage slasher films. The reverse – when films based on cult properties lose their transgressive edge – can result in derision and rejection by fans. Audience participation itself can be transgressive, such as breaking long-standing taboos against talking during films and throwing things at the screen.

According to Mathijs, critical reception is important to a film's perception as cult, through topicality and controversy. Topicality, which can be regional (such as objection to government funding of the film) or critical (such as philosophical objections to the themes), enables attention and a contextual response. Cultural topics make the film relevant and can lead to controversy, such as a moral panic, which provides opposition. Cultural values transgressed in the film, such as sexual promiscuity, can be attacked by proxy through attacks on the film. These concerns can vary from culture to culture, and they need not be at all similar. However, Mathijs says the film must invoke metacommentary for it to be more than simply culturally important. While referencing previous arguments, critics may attack its choice of genre or its very right to exist. By taking stances on these varied issues, critics assure their own relevance while helping to elevate the film to cult status. Perceived racist and reductive remarks by critics can rally fans and raise the profile of cult films, such as Rex Reed's comments about Korean culture in his review of Oldboy (2003). Critics can also polarize audiences and lead debates, such as how Joe Bob Briggs and Roger Ebert dueled over I Spit On Your Grave (1978). Briggs later contributed a commentary track to the DVD release in which he describes it as a feminist film. Films which do not attract enough controversy may be ridiculed and rejected when suggested as cult films.

Academic Peter Hutchings, noting the many definitions of a cult film that require transgressive elements, states that cult films are known in part for their excesses. Both subject matter and its depiction are portrayed in extreme ways that break taboos of good taste and aesthetic norms. Violence, gore, sexual perversity, and even the music can be pushed to stylistic excess far beyond that allowed by mainstream cinema. Film censorship can make these films obscure and make it difficult to find common criteria used to define cult films. Despite this, these films remain well-known and prized among collectors. Fans will occasionally express frustration with dismissive critics and conventional analysis, which they believe marginalizes and misinterprets paracinema. In marketing these films, young men are predominantly targeted. Horror films in particular can draw fans who seek the most extreme films. Audiences can also ironically latch on to offensive themes, such as misogyny, using these films as catharsis for the things that they hate most in life. Exploitative, transgressive elements can be pushed to excessive extremes for both humor and satire. Frank Henenlotter faced censorship and ridicule, but he found acceptance among audiences receptive to themes that Hollywood was reluctant to touch, such as violence, drug addiction, and misogyny. Lloyd Kaufman sees his films' political statements as more populist and authentic than the hypocrisy of mainstream films and celebrities. Despite featuring an abundance of fake blood, vomit, and diarrhea, Kaufman's films have attracted positive attention from critics and academics. Excess can also exist in films that highlight the excesses of 1980s fashion and commercialism.

Films that are influenced by unpopular styles or genres can become cult films. Director Jean Rollin worked within cinéma fantastique, an unpopular genre in modern France. Influenced by American films and early French fantasists, he drifted between art, exploitation, and pornography. His films were reviled by critics, but he retained a cult following drawn by the nudity and eroticism. Similarly, Jess Franco chafed under fascist censorship in Spain but became influential in Spain's horror boom of the 1960s. These transgressive films that straddle the line between art and horror may have overlapping cult followings, each with their own interpretation and reasons for appreciating it. The films that followed Jess Franco were unique in their rejection of mainstream art. Popular among fans of European horror for their subversiveness and obscurity, these later Spanish films allowed political dissidents to criticize the fascist regime within the cloak of exploitation and horror. Unlike most exploitation directors, they were not trying to establish a reputation. They were already established in the art-house world and intentionally chose to work within paracinema as a reaction against the New Spanish Cinema, an artistic revival supported by the fascists. As late as the 1980s, critics still cited Pedro Almodóvar's anti-macho iconoclasm as a rebellion against fascist mores, as he grew from countercultural rebel to mainstream respectability. Transgressive elements that limit a director's appeal in one country can be celebrated or highlighted in another. Takashi Miike has been marketed in the West as a shocking and avant-garde filmmaker despite his many family-friendly comedies, which have not been imported.

The transgressive nature of cult films can lead to their censorship. During the 1970s and early 1980s, a wave of explicit, graphic exploitation films caused controversy. Called "video nasties" within the UK, they ignited calls for censorship and stricter laws on home video releases, which were largely unregulated. Consequently, the British Board of Film Classification banned many popular cult films due to issues of sex, violence, and incitement to crime. Released during the cannibal boom, Cannibal Holocaust (1980) was banned in dozens of countries and caused the director to be briefly jailed over fears that it was a real snuff film. Although opposed to censorship, director Ruggero Deodato later agreed with cuts made by the BBFC that removed unsimulated animal killings, which limited the film's distribution. Frequently banned films may introduce questions of authenticity as fans question whether they have seen a truly uncensored cut. Cult films have been falsely claimed to have been banned to increase their transgressive reputation and explain their lack of mainstream penetration. Marketing campaigns have also used such claims to raise interest among curious audiences. Home video has allowed cult film fans to import rare or banned films, finally giving them a chance to complete their collection with imports and bootlegs. Cult films previously banned are sometimes released with much fanfare, and the fans assumed to be already familiar with the controversy. Personal responsibility is often highlighted, and a strong anti-censorship message may be present. Previously lost scenes cut by studios can be re-added and restore a director's original vision, which draws similar fanfare and acclaim from fans. Imports are sometimes censored to remove elements that would be controversial, such as references to Islamic spirituality in Indonesian cult films.

Academics have written of how transgressive themes in cult films can be regressive. David Church and Chuck Kleinhans describe an uncritical celebration of transgressive themes in cult films, including misogyny and racism. Church has also criticized gendered descriptions of transgressive content that celebrate masculinity. Joanne Hollows further identifies a gendered component to the celebration of transgressive themes in cult films, where male terms are used to describe films outside the mainstream while female terms are used to describe mainstream, conformist cinema. Jacinda Read's expansion states that cult films, despite their potential for empowerment of the marginalized, are more often used by politically incorrect males. Knowledgeable about feminism and multiculturalism, they seek a refuge from the academic acceptance of these progressive ideals. Their playful and ironic acceptance of regressive lad culture invites, and even dares, condemnation from academics and the uncool. Thus, cult films become a tool to reinforce mainstream values through transgressive content; Rebecca Feasy states that cultural hierarchies can also be reaffirmed through mockery of films perceived to be lacking masculinity. However, the sexploitation films of Doris Wishman took a feminist approach which avoids and subverts the male gaze and traditional goal-oriented methods. Wishman's subject matter, though exploitative and transgressive, was always framed in terms of female empowerment and the feminine spectator. Her use of common cult film motifs – female nudity and ambiguous gender – were repurposed to comment on feminist topics. Similarly, the films of Russ Meyer were a complicated combination of transgressive, mainstream, progressive, and regressive elements. They attracted both acclaim and denouncement from critics and progressives. Transgressive films imported from cultures that are recognizably different yet still relatable can be used to progressively examine issues in another culture.

== Subcultural appeal and fandom ==
Cult films can be used to help define or create groups as a form of subcultural capital; knowledge of cult films proves that one is "authentic" or "non-mainstream". They can be used to provoke an outraged response from the mainstream, which further defines the subculture, as only members could possibly tolerate such deviant entertainment. More accessible films have less subcultural capital; among extremists, banned films will have the most. By referencing cult films, media can identify desired demographics, strengthen bonds with specific subcultures, and stand out among those who understand the intertextuality. Popular films from previous eras may be reclaimed by genre fans long after they have been forgotten by the original audiences. This can be done for authenticity, such as horror fans who seek out now-obscure titles from the 1950s instead of the modern, well-known remakes. Authenticity may also drive fans to deny genre categorization to films perceived as too mainstream or accessible. Authenticity in performance and expertise can drive fan acclaim. Authenticity can also drive fans to decry the mainstream in the form of hostile critics and censors. Especially when promoted by enthusiastic and knowledgeable programmers, choice of venue can be an important part of expressing individuality. Besides creating new communities, cult films can link formerly disparate groups, such as fans and critics. As these groups intermix, they can influence each other, though this may be resisted by older fans, unfamiliar with these new references. In extreme cases, cult films can lead to the creation of religions, such as Dudeism. For their avoidance of mainstream culture and audiences, enjoyment of irony, and celebration of obscure subcultures, academic Martin Roberts compares cult film fans to hipsters.

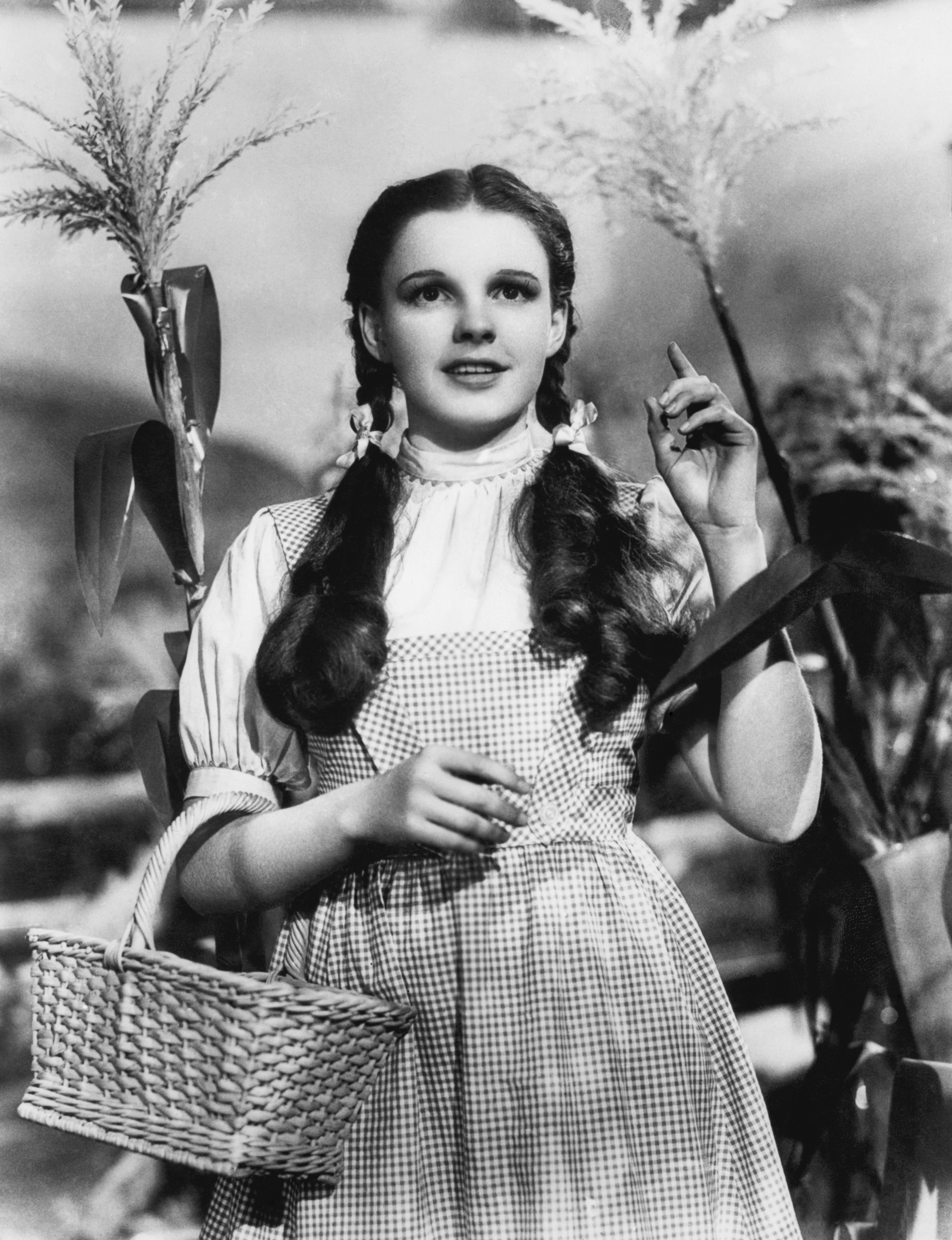
Judy Garland and her iconic role as Dorothy Gale have become important in gay culture.

A film can become the object of a cult following within a particular region or culture if it has unusual significance. For example, Norman Wisdom's films, friendly to Marxist interpretation, amassed a cult following in Albania, as they were among the few Western films allowed by the country's Communist rulers. The Wizard of Oz (1939) and its star, Judy Garland, hold special significance to American and British gay culture, although it is a widely viewed and historically important film in greater American culture. Similarly, James Dean and his brief film career have become icons of alienated youth. Cult films can have such niche appeal that they are only popular within certain subcultures, such as Reefer Madness (1936) and Hemp for Victory (1942) among the stoner subculture. Beach party musicals, popular among American surfers, failed to find an equivalent audience when imported to the United Kingdom. When films target subcultures like this, they may seem unintelligible without the proper cultural capital. Films which appeal to teenagers may offer subcultural identities that are easily recognized and differentiate various subcultural groups. Films which appeal to stereotypical male activities, such as sports, can easily gain strong male cult followings. Sports metaphors are often used in the marketing of cult films to males, such as emphasizing the "extreme" nature of the film, which increases the appeal to youth subcultures fond of extreme sports.

Matt Hills' concept of the "cult blockbuster" involves cult followings inside larger, mainstream films. Although these are big budget, mainstream films, they still attract cult followings. The cult fans differentiate themselves from ordinary fans in several ways: longstanding devotion to the film, distinctive interpretations, and fan works. Hills identifies three different cult followings for The Lord of the Rings, each with their own fandom separate from the mainstream. Academic Emma Pett identifies Back to the Future (1985) as another example of a cult blockbuster. Although the film was an instant hit when released, it has also developed a nostalgic cult following over the years. The hammy acting by Christopher Lloyd and quotable dialogue have drawn a cult following, as they mimic traditional cult films. Blockbuster science fiction films that include philosophical subtexts, such as The Matrix, allow cult film fans to enjoy them on a higher level than the mainstream. Star Wars, with its large cult following in geek subculture, has been cited as both a cult blockbuster and a cult film. Although a mainstream epic, Star Wars has provided its fans with a spirituality and culture outside of the mainstream.

Fans, in response to the popularity of these blockbusters, will claim elements for themselves while rejecting others. For example, in the Star Wars film series, mainstream criticism of Jar Jar Binks focused on racial stereotyping. Although cult film fans will use that to bolster their arguments, he is rejected because he represents mainstream appeal and marketing. Also, instead of valuing textual rarity, fans of cult blockbusters will value repeat viewings. They may also engage in behaviors more traditional for fans of cult television and other serial media, as cult blockbusters are often franchised, preconceived as a film series, or both. To reduce mainstream accessibility, a film series can be self-reflexive and full of in-jokes that only longtime fans can understand. Mainstream critics may ridicule commercially successful directors of cult blockbusters, such as James Cameron, Paul Verhoeven, Michael Bay, and Luc Besson, whose films have been called simplistic. This critical backlash may serve to embellish the filmmakers' reception as cult auteurs. In the same way, critics may ridicule fans of cult blockbusters as immature or shallow.

Cult films can create their own subculture. Rocky Horror, originally made to exploit the popularity of glam subculture, became what academic Gina Marchetti called a "sub-subculture", a variant that outlived its parent subculture. Although often described as primarily composed of obsessed fans, cult film fandom can include many newer, less experienced members. Familiar with the film's reputation and having watched clips on online video platforms, these fans may take the next step and enter the film's fandom. If they are the majority, they may alter or ignore long-standing traditions, such as audience participation rituals; rituals which lack perceived authenticity may be criticized, but accepted rituals bring subcultural capital to veteran fans who introduce them to the newer members. Newer fans may cite the film itself as their reason for attending a showing, but longtime fans often cite the community. Organized fandoms may spread and become popular as a way of introducing new people to the film. Fans of cult films, as in media fandom, are frequently producers and not simple consumers. Unconcerned with traditional views on intellectual property, these fan works are often unsanctioned, transformative, and ignore fictional canon.

Like cult films themselves, magazines and websites dedicated to cult films revel in their self-conscious offensiveness. They maintain a sense of exclusivity by offending mainstream audiences with misogyny, gore, and racism. Obsessive trivia can be used to bore mainstream audiences while building up subcultural capital. Specialist stores on the fringes of society (or websites which prominently partner with hardcore pornographic sites) can be used to reinforce the outsider nature of cult film fandom, especially when they use erotic or gory imagery. By assuming a preexisting knowledge of trivia, non-fans can be excluded. Previous articles and controversies can also be alluded to without explanation. Casual readers and non-fans will thus be left out of discussions and debates, as they lack enough information to meaningfully contribute. When fans like a cult film for the wrong reasons, such as casting or characters aimed at mainstream appeal, they may be ridiculed. Thus, fandom can keep the mainstream at bay while defining themselves in terms of the "Other", a philosophical construct divergent from social norms. Commercial aspects of fandom (such as magazines or books) can also be defined in terms of "otherness" and thus valid to consume: consumers purchasing independent or niche publications are discerning consumers, but the mainstream is denigrated. Irony or self-deprecating humor can also be used. In online communities, different subcultures attracted to transgressive films can clash over values and criteria for subcultural capital. Even within subcultures, fans who break subcultural scripts, such as denying the affectivity of a disturbing film, will be ridiculed for their lack of authenticity.

== Types ==
=== "So bad it's good" ===
Plan 9 from Outer Space, full film; runtime 01:19:03

The critic Michael Medved characterized examples of the "so bad it's good" class of low-budget cult film through books such as The Golden Turkey Awards. These films include financially fruitless and critically scorned films that have become inadvertent comedies to film buffs, such as Plan 9 from Outer Space (1957), Mommie Dearest (1981), The Room (2003), and the Ugandan action comedy film Who Killed Captain Alex? (2010). Similarly, Paul Verhoeven's Showgirls (1995) bombed in theaters but developed a cult following on video. Catching on, Metro-Goldwyn-Mayer capitalized on the film's ironic appeal and marketed it as a cult film. Sometimes, fans will impose their own interpretation of films which have attracted derision, such as reinterpreting an earnest melodrama as a comedy. Jacob deNobel of the Carroll County Times states that films can be perceived as nonsensical or inept when audiences misunderstand avant-garde filmmaking or misinterpret parody. Films such as Rocky Horror can be misinterpreted as "weird for weirdness' sake" by people unfamiliar with the cult films that they parody. deNobel ultimately rejects the use of the label "so bad it's good" as mean-spirited and often misapplied. Alamo Drafthouse programmer Zack Carlson has further said that any film which succeeds in entertaining an audience is good regardless of irony. In francophone culture, "so bad it's good" films are known as nanars. The rise of the Internet and on-demand films has led critics to question whether "so bad it's good" films have a future now that people have such diverse options in both availability and catalog, though fans eager to experience the worst films ever made can lead to lucrative showings for local theaters and merchandisers.

=== Camp and guilty pleasures ===
Chuck Kleinhans states that the difference between a guilty pleasure and a cult film can be as simple as the number of fans; David Church raises the question of how many people it takes to form a cult following, especially now that home video makes fans difficult to count. As these cult films become more popular, they can bring varied responses from fans that depend on different interpretations, such as camp, irony, genuine affection, or combinations thereof. Earnest fans, who recognize and accept the film's faults, can make minor celebrities of the film's cast, though the benefits are not always clear. Cult film stars known for their camp can inject subtle parody or signal when films should not be taken seriously. Campy actors can also provide comic book supervillains for serious, artistic-minded films. This can draw fan acclaim and obsession more readily than subtle, method-inspired acting. Mark Chalon Smith of the Los Angeles Times says technical faults may be forgiven if a film makes up for them in other areas, such as camp or transgressive content. Smith states that the early films of John Waters are amateurish and less influential than claimed, but Waters' outrageous vision cements his place in cult cinema. Films such as Myra Breckinridge (1970) and Beyond the Valley of the Dolls (1970) can experience critical reappraisal later, once their camp excess and avant-garde filmmaking are better accepted, and films that are initially dismissed as frivolous are often reassessed as campy. Films that intentionally try to appeal to fans of camp may end up alienating them, as the films become perceived as trying too hard or not authentic.

=== Nostalgia ===
According to academic Brigid Cherry, nostalgia "is a strong element of certain kinds of cult appeal." When Veoh added many cult films to their site, they cited nostalgia as a factor for their popularity. Academic I. Q. Hunter describes cult films as "New Hollywood in extremis" and a form of nostalgia for that period. Ernest Mathijs instead states that cult films use nostalgia as a form of resistance against progress and capitalistic ideas of a time-based economy. By virtue of the time travel plot, Back to the Future permits nostalgia for both the 1950s and 1980s. Many members of its nostalgic cult following are too young to have been alive during those periods, which Emma Pett interprets as fondness for retro aesthetics, nostalgia for when they saw the film rather than when it was released, and looking to the past to find a better time period. Similarly, films directed by John Hughes have taken hold in midnight movie venues, trading off of nostalgia for the 1980s and an ironic appreciation for their optimism. Mathijs and Sexton describe Grease (1978) as a film nostalgic about an imagined past that has acquired a nostalgic cult following. Other cult films, such as Streets of Fire (1984), create a new fictional world based on nostalgic views of the past. Cult films may also subvert nostalgia, such as The Big Lebowski, which introduces many nostalgic elements and then reveals them as fake and hollow. Scott Pilgrim vs. the World (2010) is another example, containing extensive nostalgia for the music and video gaming culture of the 2000s. Author China Miéville praises the use of satire in Donnie Darko for its avoidance of falling into facile and comforting nostalgia, but Nathan Lee of the New York Sun identifies the retro aesthetic and nostalgic pastiche as factors in its popularity among midnight movie crowds.

=== Midnight movies ===
Author Tomas Crowder-Taraborrelli describes midnight movies as a reaction against the political and cultural conservatism in America, and Joan Hawkins identifies the movement as running the gamut from anarchist to libertarian, united in their anti-establishment attitude and punk aesthetic. These films are resistant to simple categorization and are defined by the fanaticism and ritualistic behaviors of their audiences. Midnight movies require a night life and an audience willing to invest themselves actively. Hawkins states that these films took a rather bleak point of view due to the living conditions of the artists and the economic prospects of the 1970s. Like the surrealists and dadaists, they not only satirically attacked society but also the very structure of film – a counter-cinema that deconstructs narrative and traditional processes. In the late 1980s and 1990s, midnight movies transitioned from underground showings to home video viewings; eventually, a desire for community brought a resurgence, and The Big Lebowski kick-started a new generation. Demographics shifted, and more hip and mainstream audiences were drawn to them. Although studios expressed skepticism, large audiences were drawn to box-office flops, such as The Warriors (1979) gang movie from Walter Hill, Office Space (1999) and Donnie Darko (2001). Modern midnight movies retain their popularity and have been strongly diverging from mainstream films shown at midnight. Mainstream cinemas, eager to disassociate themselves from negative associations and increase profits, have begun abandoning midnight screenings. Although classic midnight movies have dropped off in popularity, they still bring reliable crowds.

=== Art and exploitation ===
Although seemingly at odds with each other, art and exploitation films are frequently treated as equal and interchangeable in cult fandom, listed alongside each other and described in similar terms: their ability to provoke a response. The most exploitative aspects of art films are thus played up and their academic recognition ignored. This flattening of culture follows the popularity of post-structuralism, which rejects a hierarchy of artistic merit and equates exploitation and art. Mathijs and Sexton state that although cult films are not synonymous with exploitation, as is occasionally assumed, this is a key component; they write that exploitation, which exists on the fringes of the mainstream and deals with taboo subjects, is well-suited for cult followings. Academic David Andrews writes that cult softcore films are "the most masculinized, youth-oriented, populist, and openly pornographic softcore area." The sexploitation films of Russ Meyer were among the first to abandon all hypocritical pretenses of morality and were technically proficient enough to gain a cult following. His persistent vision saw him received as an auteur worthy of academic study; director John Waters attributes this to Meyer's ability to create complicated, sexually charged films without resorting to explicit sex. Myrna Oliver described Doris Wishman's exploitation films as "crass, coarse, and camp ... perfect fodder for a cult following." "Sick films", the most disturbing and graphically transgressive films, have their own distinct cult following; these films transcend their roots in exploitation, horror, and art films. In 1960s and 1970s America, exploitation and art films shared audiences and marketing, especially in New York City's grindhouse cinemas.

=== B and genre films ===
Mathijs and Sexton state that genre is an important part of cult films; cult films will often mix, mock, or exaggerate the tropes associated with traditional genres. Science fiction, fantasy, and horror are known for their large and dedicated cult followings; as science fiction films become more popular, fans emphasize non-mainstream and less commercial aspects of it. B films, which are often conflated with exploitation, are as important to cult films as exploitation. Genre films, B films that strictly adhere to genre limitations, can appeal to cult film fans: given their transgressive excesses, horror films are likely to become cult films; films like Galaxy Quest (1999) highlight the importance of cult followings and fandom to science fiction; and authentic martial arts skills in Hong Kong action films can drive them to become cult favorites. Cult musicals can range from the traditional, such as Singin' in the Rain (1952), which appeal to cult audiences through nostalgia, camp, and spectacle, to the more non-traditional, such as Cry-Baby (1990), which parodies musicals, and Rocky Horror, which uses a rock soundtrack. Romantic fairy tale The Princess Bride (1987) failed to attract audiences in its original release, as the studio did not know how to market it. The freedom and excitement associated with cars can be an important part of drawing cult film fans to genre films, and they can signify action and danger with more ambiguity than a gun. Ad Week writes that cult B films, when released on home video, market themselves and need only enough advertising to raise curiosity or nostalgia.

=== Animation ===
Animation can provide wide open vistas for stories. The French film Fantastic Planet (1973) explored ideas beyond the limits of traditional, live-action science fiction films. Ralph Bakshi's career has been marked with controversy: Fritz the Cat (1972), the first animated film to be rated "X" by the MPAA, provoked outrage for its racial caricatures and graphic depictions of sex, and Coonskin (1975) was decried as racist. Bakshi recalls that older animators had tired of "kid stuff" and desired edgier work, whereas younger animators hated his work for "destroying the Disney images". Eventually, his work was reassessed and cult followings, which include Quentin Tarantino and Robert Rodriguez, developed around several of his films. Heavy Metal (1981) faced similar denunciations from critics. Donald Liebenson of the Los Angeles Times cites the violence and sexual imagery as alienating critics, who did not know what to make of the film. It became a popular midnight movie and was frequently bootlegged by fans, as licensing issues kept it from being released on video for many years.

Phil Hoad of The Guardian identifies Akira (1988) as introducing violent, adult Japanese animation (known as anime) to the West and paving the way for later works. Anime, according to academic Brian Ruh, is not a cult genre, but the lack of individual fandoms inside anime fandom itself lends itself to a bleeding over of cult attention and can help spread works internationally. Anime, which is frequently presented as a series (with movies either rising from existing series, or spinning off series based on the film), provides its fans with alternative fictional canons and points of view that can drive fan activity. The Ghost in the Shell films, for example, provided Japanese fans with enough bonus material and spinoffs that it encouraged cult tendencies. Markets that did not support the sale of these materials saw less cult activity.

=== Nonfiction ===
Sensationalistic documentaries called mondo films replicate the most shocking and transgressive elements of exploitation films. They are usually modeled after "sick films" and cover similar subject matter. In The Cult Film Reader, academics Mathijs and Mendik write that these documentaries often present non-Western societies as "stereotypically mysterious, seductive, immoral, deceptive, barbaric or savage". Though they can be interpreted as racist, Mathijs and Mendik state that they also "exhibit a liberal attitude towards the breaking of cultural taboos". Mondo films like Faces of Death mix real and fake footage freely, and they gain their cult following through the outrage and debate over authenticity that results. Like "so bad it's good" cult films, old propaganda and government hygiene films may be enjoyed ironically by more modern audiences for the camp value of the outdated themes and outlandish claims made about perceived social threats, such as drug use. Academic Barry K. Grant states that Frank Capra's Why We Fight World War II propaganda films are explicitly not cult, because they are "slickly made and have proven their ability to persuade an audience." The sponsored film Mr. B Natural became a cult hit when it was broadcast on the satirical television show Mystery Science Theater 3000; cast member Trace Beaulieu cited these educational shorts as his favorite to mock on the show. Mark Jancovich states that cult audiences are drawn to these films because of their "very banality or incoherence of their political positions", unlike traditional cult films, which achieve popularity through auteurist radicalism.

== Mainstream popularity ==
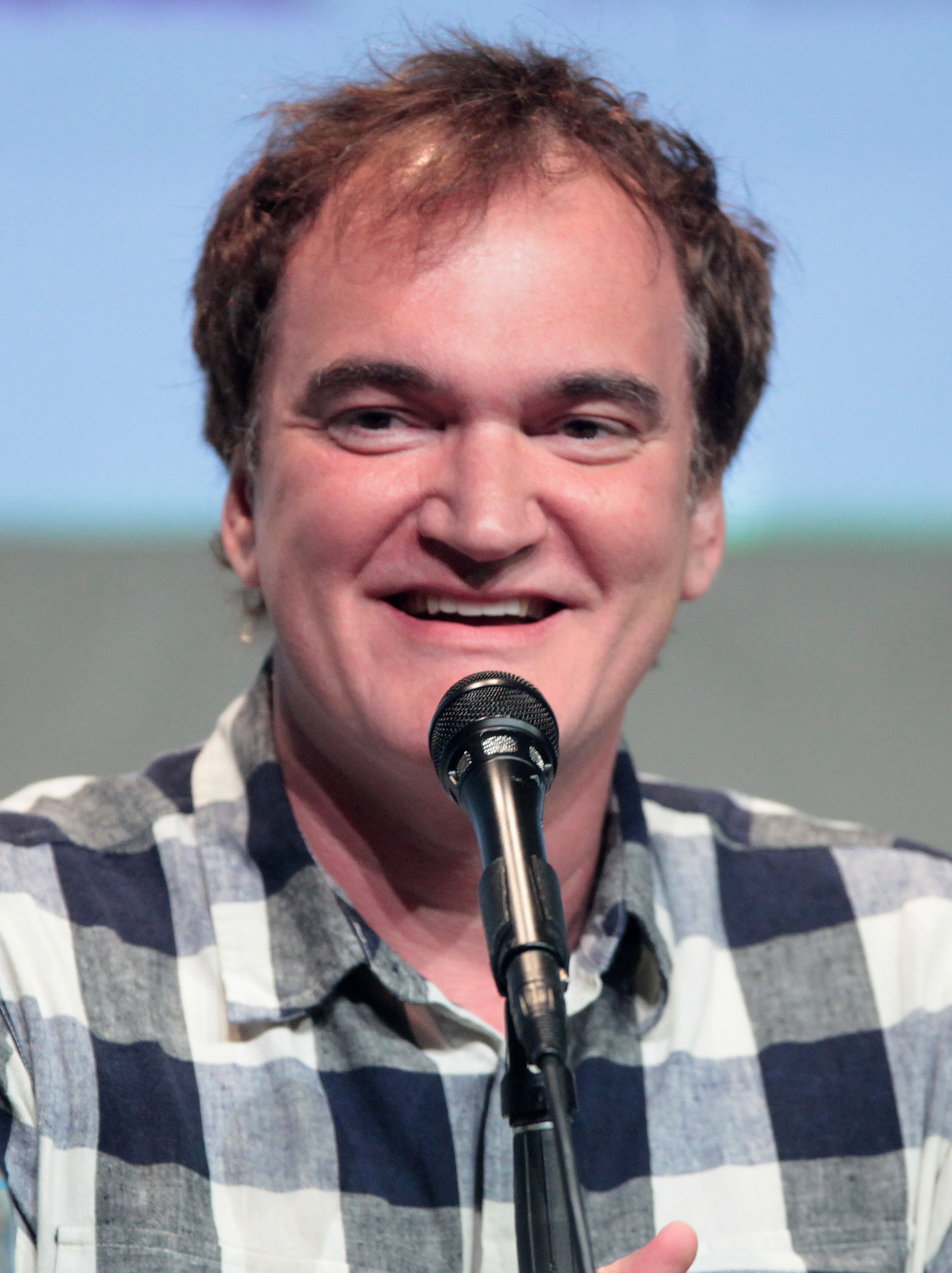
Quentin Tarantino is an example of a cult film director who has achieved mainstream success.

Mark Shiel explains the rising popularity of cult films as an attempt by cinephiles and scholars to escape the oppressive conformity and mainstream appeal of even independent film, as well as a lack of condescension in both critics and the films; Academic Donna de Ville says it is a chance to subvert the dominance of academics and cinephiles. According to Xavier Mendik, "academics have been really interested in cult movies for quite a while now." Mendik has sought to bring together academic interest and fandom through Cine-Excess, a film festival. I. Q. Hunter states that "it's much easier to be a cultist now, but it is also rather more inconsequential." Citing the mainstream availability of Cannibal Holocaust, Jeffrey Sconce rejects definitions of cult films based on controversy and excess, as they've now become meaningless. Cult films have influenced such diverse industries as cosmetics, music videos, and fashion. Cult films have shown up in less expected places; as a sign of his popularity, a bronze statue of Ed Wood has been proposed in his hometown, and L'Osservatore Romano, the official newspaper of the Holy See, has courted controversy for its endorsement of cult films and pop culture. When cities attempt to renovate neighborhoods, fans have called attempts to demolish iconic settings from cult films "cultural vandalism". Cult films can also drive tourism, even when it is unwanted. From Latin America, Alejandro Jodorowsky's film El Topo (1970) has attracted attention of rock musicians such as John Lennon, Mick Jagger, and Bob Dylan.

As far back as the 1970s, Attack of the Killer Tomatoes (1978) was designed specifically to be a cult film, and The Rocky Horror Picture Show was produced by 20th Century Fox, a major Hollywood studio. Over its decades-long release, Rocky Horror became the seventh highest grossing R-rated film when adjusted for inflation; journalist Matt Singer has questioned whether Rocky Horror's popularity invalidates its cult status. Founded in 1974, Troma Entertainment, an independent studio, became known for both its cult following and cult films. In the 1980s, Danny Peary's Cult Movies (1981) influenced director Edgar Wright and film critic Scott Tobias of The A.V. Club. The rise of home video had a mainstreaming effect on cult films and cultish behavior, though some collectors would be unlikely to self-identify as cult film fans. Film critic Joe Bob Briggs began reviewing drive-in theater and cult films, though he faced much criticism as an early advocate of exploitation and cult films. Briggs highlights the mainstreaming of cult films by pointing out the respectful obituaries that cult directors have received from formerly hostile publications and acceptance of politically incorrect films at mainstream film festivals. This acceptance is not universal, though, and some critics have resisted this mainstreaming of paracinema. Beginning in the 1990s, director Quentin Tarantino had the greatest success in turning cult films mainstream. Tarantino later used his fame to champion obscure cult films that had influenced him and set up the short-lived Rolling Thunder Pictures, which distributed several of his favorite cult films. Tarantino's clout led Phil Hoad of The Guardian to call Tarantino the world's most influential director.

As major Hollywood studios and audiences both become savvy to cult films, productions once limited to cult appeal have instead become popular hits, and cult directors have become hot properties known for more mainstream and accessible films. Remarking on the popular trend of remaking cult films, Claude Brodesser-Akner of New York magazine states that Hollywood studios have been superstitiously hoping to recreate past successes rather than trading on nostalgia. Their popularity brought some critics to proclaim the death of cult films now that they have finally become successful and mainstream, are too slick to attract a proper cult following, lack context, or are too easily found online. In response, David Church says that cult film fans have retreated to more obscure and difficult to find films, often using illegal distribution methods, which preserves the outlaw status of cult films. Virtual spaces, such as online forums and fan sites, replace the traditional fanzines and newsletters. Cult film fans consider themselves collectors, rather than consumers, as they associate consumers with mainstream, Hollywood audiences. This collecting can take the place of fetishization of a single film. Addressing concerns that DVDs have revoked the cult status of films like Rocky Horror, academic Mikel J. Koven states that small scale screenings with friends and family can replace midnight showings. Koven also identifies television shows, such as Twin Peaks, as retaining more traditional cult activities inside popular culture. Despite this, the Alamo Drafthouse has capitalized on cult films and the surrounding culture through inspiration drawn from Rocky Horror and retro promotional gimmickry. They sell out their shows regularly and have acquired a cult following of their own.

Academic Bob Batchelor, writing in Cult Pop Culture, states that the internet has democratized cult culture and destroyed the line between cult and mainstream. Fans of even the most obscure films can communicate online with each other in vibrant communities. Although known for their big-budget blockbusters, Steven Spielberg and George Lucas have criticized the current Hollywood system of gambling everything on the opening weekend of these productions. Geoffrey Macnab of The Independent instead suggests that Hollywood look to capitalize on cult films, which have exploded in popularity on the internet. The rise of social media has been a boon to cult films. Sites such as Twitter have displaced traditional venues for fandom and courted controversy from cultural critics who are unamused by campy cult films. After a clip from one of his films went viral, director-producer Roger Corman made a distribution deal with YouTube. Found footage which had originally been distributed as cult VHS collections eventually went viral on YouTube, which opened them to new generations of fans. Films such as Birdemic (2008) and The Room (2003) gained quick, massive popularity, as prominent members of social networking sites discussed them. Their rise as "instant cult classics" bypasses the years of obscurity that most cult films labor under. In response, critics have described the use of viral marketing as astroturfing and an attempt to manufacture cult films.

I. Q. Hunter identifies a prefabricated cult film style which includes "deliberately, insulting bad films", "slick exercises in dysfunction and alienation", and mainstream films "that sell themselves as worth obsessing over". Writing for NPR, Scott Tobias states that Don Coscarelli, whose previous films effortlessly attracted cult followings, has drifted into this realm. Tobias criticizes Coscarelli as trying too hard to appeal to cult audiences and sacrificing internal consistency for calculated quirkiness. Influenced by the successful online hype of The Blair Witch Project (1999), other films have attempted to draw online cult fandom with the use of prefabricated cult appeal. Snakes on a Plane (2006) is an example that attracted massive attention from curious fans. Uniquely, its cult following preceded the film's release and included speculative parodies of what fans imagined the film might be. This reached the point of convergence culture when fan speculation began to impact on the film's production. Although it was proclaimed a cult film and major game-changer before it was released, it failed to win either mainstream audiences or maintain its cult following. In retrospect, critic Spencer Kornhaber called it a serendipitous novelty and a footnote to a "more naive era of the Internet". However, it became influential in both marketing and titling. This trend of "instant cult classics" which are hailed yet fail to attain a lasting following is described by Matt Singer, who states that the phrase is an oxymoron.

Cult films are often approached in terms of auteur theory, which states that the director's creative vision drives a film. This has fallen out of favor in academia, creating a disconnect between cult film fans and critics. Matt Hills states that auteur theory can help to create cult films; fans that see a film as continuing a director's creative vision are likely to accept it as cult. According to academic Greg Taylor, auteur theory also helped to popularize cult films when middlebrow audiences found an accessible way to approach avant-garde film criticism. Auteur theory provided an alternative culture for cult film fans while carrying the weight of scholarship. By requiring repeated viewings and extensive knowledge of details, auteur theory naturally appealed to cult film fans. Taylor further states that this was instrumental in allowing cult films to break through to the mainstream. Academic Joe Tompkins states that this auteurism is often highlighted when mainstream success occurs. This may take the place of – and even ignore – political readings of the director. Cult films and directors may be celebrated for their transgressive content, daring, and independence, but Tompkins argues that mainstream recognition requires they be palatable to corporate interests who stand to gain much from the mainstreaming of cult film culture. While critics may champion revolutionary aspects of filmmaking and political interpretation, Hollywood studios and other corporate interests will instead highlight only the aspects that they wish to legitimize in their own films, such as sensational exploitation. Someone like George A. Romero, whose films are both transgressive and subversive, will have the transgressive aspects highlighted while the subversive aspects are ignored.

== See also ==
- B movie – Low-budget commercial film genre
- Cult video game
- List of cult films – List of films that generated cult following
- Mockbuster – Film made to exploit another's publicity
- Sleeper hit – Successful media that was initially unsuccessful
