= Sessions '64 =

Compilation album by various artists
- Released: April 18, 2015
- Recorded: October 11, 1963–February 17, 1964
- Producers: Brian Wilson; Jimmy Bowen

Brian Wilson chronology
No Pier Pressure (2015)	Sessions '64 (2015)	Playback: The Brian Wilson Anthology (2017)

Sessions '64 is a compilation album released for Record Store Day 2015 on April 18. It features productions by Brian Wilson and Jimmy Bowen for the artists the Honeys, the Castells, and the Timers. The album was issued as a limited edition 10-inch gold vinyl with only 1,500 copies pressed.

The set marks the first official release of the Honeys' instrumental "I Can See Right Through You" (also known as "Go Away Boy") recorded on February 17, 1964. Previously, the Honeys had released a rerecorded version on their 1983 album "Ecstasy". A cover was also recorded by Pearlfishers for the Beach Boys tribute album Caroline Now! (2000).

== Track listing ==
All tracks are written by Brian Wilson, except "No Go Showboat" by Wilson and Roger Christian and "The Love of a Boy and a Girl" by Sandra Glantz and Diane Rovell.

Side one
No.	Title	Performers	Length
1.	"He's a Doll" (mono master)	The Honeys
2.	"He's a Doll" (stereo mix)	The Honeys
3.	"He's a Doll" (stereo backing track)	The Honeys
4.	"The Love of a Boy and a Girl" (mono master)	The Honeys
5.	"I Can See Right Through You (Go Away Boy)" (stereo backing track)	The Honeys

Side two
No.	Title	Performers	Length
1.	"I Do" (stereo mix)	The Castells
2.	"I Do" (stereo backing track)	The Castells
3.	"No Go Showboat" (stereo mix)	The Timers
4.	"No Go Showboat" (stereo backing track)	The Timers
