= Amusement Parks U.S.A. =

- The 1965 Japanese single release of the song

Song by The Beach Boys

from the album Summer Days (and Summer Nights!!)
- Released: July 5, 1965
- Recorded: April 14 – May 5, 1965
- Length: 2:29
- Label: Capitol
- Songwriters: Brian Wilson, Mike Love
- Producer: Brian Wilson

"Amusement Parks U.S.A." is a song written by Brian Wilson and Mike Love for the American rock band The Beach Boys. It was released on their 1965 album Summer Days (and Summer Nights!!). Produced by Wilson and featuring a lead vocal by Love, the song's lyrics describe "mess[ing] around at the [amusement] park all day." A short bridge section with session drummer Hal Blaine imitating a carnival barker is also featured, interpolating the spoken introduction to the Coasters' song "Little Egypt (Ying-Yang)".

The lyrics mention such amusement parks as Palisades Park in Cliffside Park, New Jersey; Salisbury Park in Salisbury, Massachusetts; Euclid Beach Park in Cleveland; Riverview Park in Chicago; Disneyland and Pacific Ocean Park in the Los Angeles area; and Steel Pier in Atlantic City, New Jersey. All but Disneyland and Steel Pier ceased operation within a few years of the song's release.

== Alternate releases ==
"Amusement Parks U.S.A." was released as the B-side to "Salt Lake City" on a promotional single. It was also released as a single in Japan, backed with "The Rocking Surfer." The song was omitted from the 1980s re-release of Summer Days (and Summer Nights!!) (retitled California Girls), along with "I'm Bugged at My Ol' Man."

== Reception ==
AllMusic critic Richie Unterberger described the track as a "subpar effort" and as one of the "throwbacks to the empty-headed summer filler of previous days" on Summer Days (and Summer Nights!!). Author Jim Fuselli called the track a throwback "to the group's happy-go-lucky days," after also describing the album that it first appeared on as lacking "a coherent lyrical theme."

== Personnel ==
Personnel sourced from Craig Slowinski.

The Beach Boys

- Al Jardine – harmony and backing vocals
- Mike Love – lead and bass vocals
- Brian Wilson – lead, harmony, and backing vocals, grand piano, laughter
- Carl Wilson – harmony and backing vocals
- Dennis Wilson – harmony and backing vocals

Session musicians and production staff

- Charles Berghofer – upright bass
- Hal Blaine – drums, castanets, tambourine, carnival barker
- Carol Kaye – bass guitar
- Jerry Cole – 6-string bass guitar
- Steve Douglas – tenor saxophone
- Jay Migliori – baritone saxophone
- Leon Russell – Hammond B-3 organ
- Billy Strange – 12-string guitar
- Julius Wechter – vibraphone
