= Spring (American Spring album) =

Studio album by Spring
- Released: July 1972
- Recorded: January 7, 1970 ("Good Time"); October 8, 1971 – May 1972
- Studios: Beach Boys, Los Angeles, CA
- Length: 34:50
- Label: United Artists
- Producer: Brian Wilson

Singles from Spring
- 1. "Now That Everything's Been Said" Released: October 20, 1971; 2. "Good Time" Released: May 1, 1972

American Spring reissue cover

Spring is the only album by American pop duo Spring, released in July 1972 on United Artists. It contains cover versions of popular songs as well as original material written or co-written by Brian Wilson of the Beach Boys. Although Brian is the album's only credited producer, most of the production was actually handled by his collaborator at the time, David Sandler, alongside engineer Stephen Desper.

The album sold poorly, and in later years became a valuable collector's item. The record was soon renamed American Spring, along with the band, to avoid confusion with the English band Spring. In 1977, the Beach Boys included their version of the album's second single, "Good Time", on their album The Beach Boys Love You. In 1998, Spring was reissued on CD with four bonus tracks.

== Background and recording ==
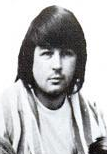
Brian Wilson, 1971

Thanks to a mutual connection with Bruce Johnston, Brian Wilson met David Sandler, a Minnesota-based songwriter/producer, at a session for "Good Time". The song was intended for what became the Beach Boys' album Sunflower. It was left off the record, and the backing track (produced on January 7, 1970) was ultimately used for Spring. Wilson and Sandler kept in touch, and a few months later, Wilson asked Sandler to co-produce what became the Spring album.

Spring was largely tracked in Wilson's home studio in Bel Air, California from October 8, 1971 to May 1972. The album was produced by Wilson, Sandler, and engineer Stephen Desper. According to Sandler, Wilson's actual role in the project "ebbed and flowed". Wilson was occasionally absent during sessions, leaving Sandler and Desper to produce the record by themselves, sometimes with assistance from Sunrays member Rick Henn.

Sessions coincided with the Beach Boys' recording of Carl and the Passions – "So Tough", an album that featured less involvement from Wilson than Spring. According to Sandler, Wilson "was definitely trying to establish some independence from the group, and the Spring album was part of that. He still had a lot of music in him, but I think he was depressed. And maybe some of the people who were supposed to be helping him were hacking away but not helping him that much."

One of the album's outtakes was a medley of the Four Tops' "Baby I Need Your Loving" and the Spencer Davis Group's "Gimme Some Lovin"; the track was abandoned after Wilson received a lukewarm reaction from his bandmates. There were also plans for Sandler to co-produce the Beach Boys' next album. Explaining why it never happened, Sandler commented, "There were personality things, family things, going on." In 2021, the Beach Boys' unfinished recording of Sandler's "It's Natural", produced by Wilson and Sandler, was released on the box set Feel Flows.

== Release and reception ==
Professional ratings
Review scores
Source	Rating
AllMusic	3/5 stars
Christgau's Record Guide	B+

Spring was released in the US by United Artists in July 1972. Elsewhere, and on later reissues of the album, the record was renamed "American Spring" to avoid confusion with the English band of the same name. The album was critically acclaimed but sold poorly.

Reviewing in Christgau's Record Guide: Rock Albums of the Seventies (1981), Robert Christgau wrote of the album: "In which Brian Wilson produces his old female backup group—the Honeys, featuring his wife Marilyn—in what sounds like the best and is certainly the most charming Beach Boys album since Sunflower. The old combination of ingenuousness and sophistication works as well as ever, only this time the vocals rather than the lyrics are naive—direct, pretty, effortless, thoughtless. And Wilson's studio work is as precise and humorous as ever."

== Track listing ==
Side one
No.	Title	Writer(s)	Length
1.	"Tennessee Waltz"	Pee Wee King, Redd Stewart	2:03
2.	"Thinkin' Bout You Baby"	Brian Wilson, Mike Love	3:05
3.	"Mama Said"	Willie Denson, Luther Dixon	2:34
4.	"Superstar"	Bonnie Bramlett, Leon Russell	3:31
5.	"Awake"	Floyd Tucker	3:24
6.	"Sweet Mountain"	B. Wilson, David Sandler	4:13

Side two
No.	Title	Writer(s)	Length
1.	"Everybody"	Tommy Roe	2:20
2.	"This Whole World"	B. Wilson	3:11
3.	"Forever"	Dennis Wilson, Gregg Jakobson	3:14
4.	"Good Time"	Al Jardine, B. Wilson	2:50
5.	"Now That Everything's Been Said"	Carole King	2:16
6.	"Down Home"	Gerry Goffin, King	2:44
Total length:			34:50

1989 CD bonus tracks
No.	Title	Writer(s)	Length
13.	"Shyin' Away"	Diane Rovell, Sandler, Marilyn Wilson	2:10
14.	"Fallin' in Love"	D. Wilson	2:37
15.	"It's Like Heaven"	Rovell, B. Wilson	2:36
16.	"Had to Phone Ya"	B. Wilson, Love, Rovell	2:03

== Personnel ==
Sourced from the original album cover

American Spring

- Diane Rovell - vocals
- Marilyn Wilson - vocals

Session musicians

- Keith Allison, Ray Pohlman - bass
- David Cohen, Larry Carlton, Carl Wilson - guitar
- John Guerin - drums
- Lincoln Mayorga, David Sandler - piano
- Alan Beutler - horns
- Igor Horoshevsky - cello
- Brian Wilson - “everything”

Production staff

- Brian Wilson - producer
- Stephen Desper - engineer, uncredited co-producer
- David Sandler - uncredited co-producer
