= Playback: The Brian Wilson Anthology =

Compilation album by Brian Wilson
- Released: September 22, 2017
- Recorded: 1987–2017
- Label: Rhino

Brian Wilson chronology
Sessions '64 (2015)	Playback: The Brian Wilson Anthology (2017)	At My Piano (2021)

Playback: The Brian Wilson Anthology is a compilation album devoted to the solo career of American musician Brian Wilson, released on September 22, 2017. It covers three decades of music with selections from nine of Wilson's solo albums, released between 1988 and 2015. The album includes two previously unreleased tracks: "Run James Run", an outtake from No Pier Pressure completed for the compilation, and "Some Sweet Day", a song Wilson wrote and recorded with Andy Paley in the early 1990s.

The packaging features a selection of photos from throughout Wilson's solo career, including a candid shot taken in the studio during the recording of "Run James Run".

== Track listing ==
No.	Title	Writer(s)	Original album	Length
1.	"Love and Mercy"	Brian Wilson	Brian Wilson, 1988	2:56
2.	"Surf's Up"	Wilson, Van Dyke Parks	Brian Wilson Presents Smile, 2004	4:06
3.	"Heroes and Villains"	Wilson, Parks	Brian Wilson Presents Smile	4:53
4.	"Melt Away"	Brian Wilson	Brian Wilson	2:59
5.	"Let it Shine"	Wilson, Jeff Lynne	Brian Wilson	3:58
6.	"Some Sweet Day"	Wilson, Andy Paley	Andy Paley sessions, previously unreleased	2:39
7.	"Rio Grande"	Wilson, Paley	Brian Wilson	8:12
8.	"Cry"	Wilson	Imagination, 1998	4:59
9.	"Lay Down Burden"	Wilson, Joe Thomas	Imagination	3:44
10.	"The First Time"	Wilson	Live at the Roxy Theatre, 2000	3:32
11.	"This Isn't Love"	Wilson, Tony Asher	Live at the Roxy Theatre	3:55
12.	"Soul Searchin'"	Wilson, Paley	Gettin' In Over My Head, 2004	4:08
13.	"Gettin' In Over My Head"	Wilson, Paley	Gettin' In Over My Head	4:27
14.	"The Like In I Love You"	George Gershwin, Wilson, Scott Bennett	Brian Wilson Reimagines Gershwin, 2010	3:19
15.	"Midnight's Another Day"	Wilson, Bennett	That Lucky Old Sun, 2008	4:12
16.	"Colors of the Wind"	Alan Menken, Stephen Schwartz	In the Key of Disney, 2011	3:59
17.	"One Kind of Love"	Wilson, Bennett	Music from Love & Mercy, 2014 (also No Pier Pressure, 2015)	3:34
18.	"Run James Run"	Wilson, Thomas	No Pier Pressure sessions, previously unreleased	3:27
