= Pet Projects: The Brian Wilson Productions =

Compilation album by The Honeys / Various Artists
- Released: 7 February 2003
- Recorded: 1963–73
- Genres: Pop, rock, surf, psychedelia
- Length: 51:48
- Label: Ace Records (CDCHD 851)
- Producer: Brian Wilson
- Compiler: Rob Finnis

Professional ratings
Review scores
Source	Rating
AllMusic	4/5 stars

Pet Projects: The Brian Wilson Productions is a CD compilation album of the recorded work of record producer, songwriter, and musician Brian Wilson as he attempted to branch away from his band the Beach Boys during the early-to-mid-1960s and early 1970s. The compilation features performing artists such as Glen Campbell, Gary Usher, the Honeys, American Spring, Jan and Dean, Sharon Marie, and the Survivors. It was released with a full-color 20-page booklet with rare photos and a detailed essay.

The compilation is the only one of its kind to be released under internationally legitimate circumstances. Previously, Still I Dream of it: Rare Works of Brian Wilson was a similarly-themed grey area Japanese release now considered by law to be a bootleg. The issue of legality is also prominent on Pet Projects; some tracks were evidently unavailable due to contractual reasons. Noted absences include Bob & Sheri's "The Surfer Moon" & "Humpty Dumpty", the Castells' "I Do", the Honeys' "The Love of a Boy and a Girl", Bob & Bobby's "Twelve-O-Four" & "Baby What You Want Me To Do", and Ron Wilson's "I'll Keep on Loving You" & "As Tears Go By".

== Track list ==
All tracks are written by Brian Wilson, except where noted.

No.	Title	Writer(s)	Performed by	Length
1.	"Run-Around Lover"		Sharon Marie	1:53
2.	"Thinkin' 'Bout You Baby"	Mike Love/B. Wilson	Sharon Marie	2:34
3.	"Pamela Jean"		The Survivors	2:38
4.	"After The Game"		The Survivors	2:01
5.	"Sacramento"	Gary Usher/B. Wilson	Gary Usher	1:58
6.	"That's the Way I Feel"	Usher	Gary Usher	2:06
7.	"The One You Can't Have"		The Honeys	1:57
8.	"Surfin' Down the Swanee River"	Stephen C. Foster, arr. B. Wilson	The Honeys	2:15
9.	"Summertime"	George Gershwin/Ira Gershwin/Du Bose Heyward/Dorothy Heyward	Sharon Marie	1:36
10.	"Hide Go Seek"		The Honeys	1:46
11.	"Shyin' Away"	Diane Rovell/David Sandler/Marilyn Wilson	Spring	2:54
12.	"Fallin' in Love"	Dennis Wilson	Spring	2:28
13.	"Pray for Surf"	Rovell	The Honeys	2:29
14.	"Shoot the Curl"	Rovell	The Honeys	2:21
15.	"Vegetables"	B. Wilson/Van Dyke Parks	Laughing Gravy	2:21
16.	"The Revo-Lution"	Usher/B. Wilson	Rachel and the Revolvers	2:11
17.	"Number One"	Usher/B. Wilson	Rachel and the Revolvers	2:10
18.	"She Rides With Me"	Roger Christian/B. Wilson	Paul Peterson	1:56
19.	"Guess I'm Dumb"	Russ Titelman/B. Wilson	Glen Campbell	2:41
20.	"Story of My Life"	Love/B. Wilson	Sharon Marie	2:35
21.	"He's a Doll"		The Honeys	2:08
22.	"Tonight You Belong to Me"	David Lee/Billy Rose	The Honeys	2:07
23.	"Goodnight My Love"	John Marascalco/George Matola	The Honeys	2:51
Total length:				51:48
