= I Do (The Castells song) =

1964 single by the Castells

Single by the Castells
- B-side: "Teardrops"
- Released: March 9, 1964
- Recorded: November 1963–January 1964
- Studio: RCA Victor; Western; Gold Star; (Hollywood)
- Length: 1:47
- Label: Warner Bros.
- Songwriters: Brian Wilson, Roger Christian
- Producer: Brian Wilson

The Castells singles chronology
"Some Enchanted Evening" (1963)	"I Do" (1964)	"Could This Be Magic" (1964)

"I Do" is a song written by Brian Wilson and Roger Christian, originally released as a single by American vocal group the Castells on March 9, 1964. The recording was also produced and arranged by Wilson. The song's lyrics illustrate a young man getting ready for marriage. Its melody was derived from "County Fair", a song Wilson had earlier written for the Beach Boys.

According to Keith Mansfield, "the song didn't do much for the Castells, but it was a memorable experience [for Chuck Girard]". Musicologist Philip Lambert noted: "The 'I Do' intro is directly inspired by the instrumental accumulation in 'Be My Baby' and in the earlier [Phil] Spector production of the Crystals' 'Oh Yeah Maybe Baby' (1961), which have similar rhythms and instrumental combinations."

== Recording ==
The backing track of "I Do" was recorded during a 3-hour session at RCA Victor Studio on November 6, 1963. This was followed in January 1964 with two vocal overdubbing sessions with the Castells at United Western Recorders and Gold Star Studios.

== Variations ==
Versions performed by the Beach Boys were included as a bonus track on the 1990 CD reissue Surfer Girl / Shut Down Volume 2 and the 2013 compilation The Big Beat 1963. In 2014, the compilation Sessions '64 included the song's backing track.

== Cover versions ==
- 1992 – Tatsuro Yamashita
