= Best of the Beach Boys =

1966 compilation album released by the Beach Boys

- US release

Greatest hits album by the Beach Boys
- Released: July 5, 1966
- Length: 27:47 (US); 32:53 (UK)
- Labels: Capitol (US); Capitol/EMI (UK)
- Producer: Brian Wilson

The Beach Boys US chronology
Pet Sounds (1966)	Best of the Beach Boys (1966)	Best of the Beach Boys Vol. 2 (1967)

The Beach Boys UK chronology
Summer Days (And Summer Nights!!) (1966)	Best of the Beach Boys (1966)	Surfer Girl (1967)

Professional ratings
Review scores
Source	Rating
AllMusic	3.5/5 stars

Best of the Beach Boys is the first compilation album released by the American rock band the Beach Boys through Capitol Records in 1966. The first version was released in the United States on July 5, 1966, two months after Pet Sounds. Another version of Best of The Beach Boys was issued in the United Kingdom on November 11, 1966, with a track listing that differed from the American release.

== Release ==
The American release of Best of The Beach Boys includes a selection of 12 songs the band had recorded from 1963 to 1965, many of them singles or B-sides. The album reached number eight on the US charts and was certified gold by the RIAA on April 12, 1967, and double platinum on December 1, 1991.

The British version of Best of The Beach Boys was released with songs that differed to its American counterpart. This version, initially compiled as a DJ sampler by EMI, sold close to 200,000 copies by September 1967 and spent a total of 142 weeks on the UK album charts, peaking at number two.

== Track listing ==
=== US edition ===
All tracks are written by Brian Wilson and Mike Love, except where noted.

Side 1
No.	Title	Writer(s)	Original album	Length
1.	"Surfin' U.S.A."	B. Wilson, Chuck Berry	Surfin' U.S.A., 1963	2:28
2.	"Catch a Wave"		Surfer Girl, 1963	2:18
3.	"Surfer Girl"	B. Wilson	Surfer Girl	2:26
4.	"Little Deuce Coupe"	B. Wilson, Roger Christian	Surfer Girl	1:50
5.	"In My Room"	B. Wilson, Gary Usher	Surfer Girl	2:13
6.	"Little Honda"		All Summer Long, 1964	1:51

Side 2
No.	Title	Writer(s)	Original album	Length
1.	"Fun, Fun, Fun"		Shut Down Volume 2, 1964	2:18
2.	"The Warmth of the Sun"		Shut Down Volume 2	2:50
3.	"Louie, Louie"	Richard Berry	Shut Down Volume 2	2:23
4.	"Kiss Me, Baby"		The Beach Boys Today!, 1965	2:35
5.	"You're So Good to Me"		Summer Days (And Summer Nights!!), 1965	2:13
6.	"Wendy"		All Summer Long	2:22

=== UK edition ===
Side one

1. "Surfin' Safari" (B. Wilson/Love) – 2:05
2. "Surfin' U.S.A." (B. Wilson/Berry) – 2:28
3. "Little Deuce Coupe" (B. Wilson/Love) – 1:50
4. "Fun, Fun, Fun" (B. Wilson/Love) – 2:18
5. "I Get Around" (B. Wilson/Love) – 2:12
6. "All Summer Long" (B. Wilson/Love) – 2:05
7. "In My Room" (B. Wilson/Usher) – 2:13

Side two

1. "Do You Wanna Dance?" (Bobby Freeman) – 2:18
2. "Help Me, Rhonda" (B. Wilson/Love) – 2:45
3. "California Girls" (B. Wilson/Love) – 2:37
4. "Barbara Ann" (Fred Fassert) – 2:05
5. "You're So Good to Me" (B. Wilson/Love) – 2:13
6. "Sloop John B" (trad. arr. B. Wilson/Al Jardine) – 2:55
7. "God Only Knows" (B. Wilson/Tony Asher) – 2:49

== See also ==
- List of albums which have spent the most weeks on the UK Albums Chart

== Charts ==
Chart (1966)	Peak position
US Billboard Top LPs	8
UK Top Albums	2
