= The Big Beat 1963 =

Compilation album by various artists
- Released: December 17, 2013
- Recorded: 1963
- Genre: Rock, surf rock, rock and roll
- Length: 49:02
- Label: Capitol
- Producer: Alan Boyd; Mark Linett; Brian Wilson (original recordings)

Brian Wilson chronology
In the Key of Disney (2011)	The Big Beat 1963 (2013)	No Pier Pressure (2015)

The Beach Boys chronology
Made in California (2013)	The Big Beat 1963 (2013)	Keep an Eye on Summer – The Beach Boys Sessions 1964 (2014)

The Big Beat 1963 is a compilation album released on December 17, 2013, exclusively through digital distribution. It features selections of early demos and recordings made by Brian Wilson in the early 1960s with such acts as the Beach Boys and the Honeys.

The compilation's release came as a result of revised European copyright laws, forcing some labels to publish unreleased archival material so that they will not lose their copyright. None of the tracks contained within had been commercially released, although many had appeared on bootlegs.

== Track listing ==
All tracks are written by Brian Wilson except where indicated.

No.	Title	Writer(s)	Performer(s)	Length
1.	"The Big Beat"		Bob & Sheri
2.	"First Rock and Roll Dance" (Instrumental)		Brian Wilson
3.	"Gonna Hustle You" (Demo)	Wilson, Bob Norberg	Brian Wilson
4.	"Ride Away"	Wilson, Norberg	Bob & Sheri
5.	"Funny Boy"		The Honeys
6.	"Marie"		Bob Norberg & Brian Wilson, with The Honeys
7.	"Mother May I"		The Beach Boys
8.	"I Do" (Demo)	Wilson, Roger Christian	The Beach Boys
9.	"Bobby Left Me" (Backing track)		Brian Wilson
10.	"If It Can't Be You" (a.k.a. I'll Never Love Again)		Gary Usher
11.	"You Brought It All on Yourself"		The Honeys
12.	"Make the Night a Little Longer"	Carole King, Gerry Goffin	The Honeys
13.	"Rabbit's Foot" (Unfinished track with backing vocals)		The Honeys
14.	"Summer Moon"		Vicki Kocher and Bob Norberg
15.	"Side Two" (Instrumental)		The Beach Boys
16.	"Ballad of Ole Betsy" (Demo)	Wilson, Christian	The Beach Boys
17.	"Thank Him" (Demo)		Brian Wilson
18.	"Once You've Got Him"	Ginger Blake, Dianne Rovell	The Honeys
19.	"For Always and Forever" (Demo)	Blake, Rovell	The Honeys
20.	"Little Dirt Bike" (Demo)	Blake, Rovell	The Honeys
21.	"Darling I'm Not Stepping Out On You" (Demo)	Blake, Rovell	The Honeys
22.	"When I Think About You" (Demo)	Blake, Rovell	The Honeys
Total length:				49:02
