= Best of the Beach Boys Vol. 2 =

Greatest hits album by the Beach Boys
- Released: July 24, 1967
- Length: 28:43
- Label: Capitol
- Producer: Brian Wilson

The Beach Boys chronology
Best of the Beach Boys (1966)	Best of the Beach Boys Vol. 2 (1967)	Smiley Smile (1967)

The Beach Boys UK chronology
Surfer Girl (1967)	Best of The Beach Boys Vol. 2 (1967)	Smiley Smile (1967)

Professional ratings
Review scores
Source	Rating
AllMusic	3.5/5 stars

Best of the Beach Boys Vol. 2 is a compilation album by the American rock band the Beach Boys. It is a sequel to the previous year's hits package. It was compiled by Capitol Records after Brian Wilson had announced the shelving of Smile.

Best of the Beach Boys Vol. 2 initially flopped in the US, only reaching #50. The fact that Smile had been shelved two months earlier meant the group had no new material to release in time for the Summer of Love, although the music composed for that album was radical enough to have been part of it. Another commercial blunder came from their failure to appear at the Monterey International Pop Festival, which they had helped to organize and had been slated to headline as the closing act.

However, a reworked track list issued under the same title in the UK in late 1967 proved to be another big success. Like its predecessor, Best of the Beach Boys Vol. 2 is out of print.

== Track listing ==
Side 1
No.	Title	Original album	Length
1.	"Barbara Ann" (Fred Fassert)	Beach Boys' Party!, 1965	2:11
2.	"When I Grow Up (To Be a Man)" (Brian Wilson/Mike Love)	The Beach Boys Today!, 1965	2:01
3.	"Long, Tall Texan" (Henry Strezlecki)	Beach Boys Concert, 1964	2:30
4.	"Please Let Me Wonder" (B. Wilson/M. Love)	The Beach Boys Today!	2:45
5.	"409" (B. Wilson/M. Love/Gary Usher)	Surfin' Safari, 1962	1:59
6.	"Let Him Run Wild" (B. Wilson/M. Love)	Summer Days (And Summer Nights!!), 1965	2:20

Side 2
No.	Title	Original album	Length
1.	"Don't Worry Baby" (B. Wilson/Roger Christian)	Shut Down Volume 2, 1964	2:47
2.	"Surfin' Safari" (B. Wilson/M. Love)	Surfin' Safari	2:05
3.	"Little Saint Nick" (B. Wilson/M. Love)	The Beach Boys' Christmas Album, 1964	1:59
4.	"California Girls" (B. Wilson/M. Love)	Summer Days (And Summer Nights!!)	2:38
5.	"Help Me, Rhonda" (B. Wilson/M. Love)	Summer Days (And Summer Nights!!)	2:46
6.	"I Get Around" (B. Wilson/M. Love)	All Summer Long, 1964	2:12

The Duophonic version of the album features true stereo mixes of "Long Tall Texan", "Don't Worry Baby" and "Little Saint Nick".

"Please Let Me Wonder" and "Little Saint Nick" do not appear on the cassette tape version.

Best of The Beach Boys Vol. 2 (Capitol (D) 2706) hit number 50 in the US during a 22-week tenure. In the UK, it reached number 3.

== British version ==
The British version of Best of the Beach Boys Vol. 2 was released in mid-1967 with 14 songs, instead of the usual 12 found on American albums.

Side A

1. "Surfer Girl" – 2:26
2. "Don't Worry Baby" – 2:51
3. "Wendy" – 2:22
4. "When I Grow Up (To Be a Man)" – 2:02
5. "Good to My Baby" – 2:16
6. "Dance, Dance, Dance" – 1:58
7. "Then I Kissed Her" – 2:15

Side B

1. "The Girl from New York City" – 1:53
2. "Girl Don't Tell Me" – 2:19
3. "The Little Girl I Once Knew" – 2:36
4. "Mountain of Love" – 2:47
5. "Here Today" – 2:52
6. "Wouldn't It Be Nice" – 2:22
7. "Good Vibrations" – 3:35

== Charts ==
Chart (1967)	Peak position
US Billboard Top LPs	50
