= The Hondells =

American surf rock band

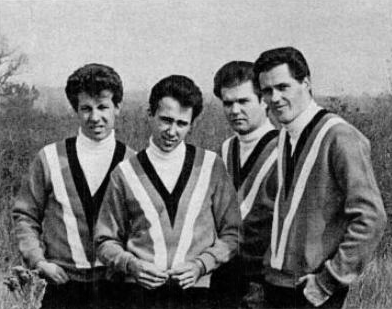
- The Hondells in 1965

Background information
- Origin: Los Angeles, California, United States
- Genres: Surf rock
- Years active: 1964–1970
- Labels: Mercury, Repertoire
- Past members: Wayne Edwards; Mike Hufford; Randy Thomas; Chuck Girard; Gary Usher; Joe Kelly; Dick Burns; Al Ferguson

The Hondells were an American surf rock band. Their cover of the Beach Boys' "Little Honda" went to No. 9 on the Billboard Hot 100 in 1964.

== History ==
The Hondells were a band manufactured by Gary Usher, originally consisting of session musicians. Their hit song, "Little Honda," was written by Brian Wilson and Mike Love of the Beach Boys. The song was inspired by the popularity of Honda motor bikes in Southern California during the early 1960s: In contrast to the prevailing negative stereotypes of motorcyclists in America as tough, antisocial rebels, Honda's campaign suggested that their motorcycles were made for everyone. The campaign was successful; by the end of 1963 alone, Honda had sold 90,000 motorcycles. The Beach Boys had recorded "Little Honda" for their 1964 album All Summer Long, and subsequently producer Gary Usher gave former Castells vocalist Chuck Girard a copy of the All Summer Long LP and instructed him to learn "Little Honda."

Usher then recruited a group of studio musicians – including Glen Campbell, Al DeLory, Tommy Tedesco, and Richie Podolor – to record an album of Honda-related songs for Mercury Records, with production credited to Nick Venet, though Usher was the brains behind the record. Aside from "Little Honda," most of the songs on the Hondells' Go Little Honda album were written by Usher and KFWB disc jockey and lyricist Roger Christian. The album's cover showed a four-member group and its liner notes contained an elaborate back story, penned by Christian, which posited one Ritchie Burns as the founder and leader of the band. At the time the album was delivered, the name of the group had not been decided. Under consideration were two names: "The Rising Sons" and "The Hondells." Venet chose the latter and released "Little Honda" as a single under the new group name. As the song climbed the charts, Usher assembled a band to tour in support, and "Little Honda" eventually peaked at No. 9 on the U.S. pop singles chart.

Contrary to popular belief, session musician drummer Hal Blaine (creator of the name "The Wrecking Crew") was not the drummer on the Hondells' version of "Little Honda". It was Wayne Edwards, who, together with Richard Burns (who played bass on the session and was cited on the album's liner notes as the band's "founder"), went out on the road as part of the touring Hondells. Blaine played drums on the Super Stocks' "Little Honda" (produced by Gary Usher for Capitol) and on Pat Boone's version of the tune (produced by Terry Melcher as a single for Dot Records).

As soon as they saw the Hondells' version on the charts, Capitol Records released a single of their Beach Boys version and scored a minor hit as well.

The Hondells scored another modest hit single in 1966 with a cover of the Lovin' Spoonful song "Younger Girl" (Mercury 72562) before disbanding. Randy Thomas sang the lead.

The Hondells also recorded commercials for Pepsi and Coty Cosmetics. Musicians on these recordings were Ritchie Burns, Glen Campbell, Wayne Edwards, Dennis McCarthy, Randy Thomas (who sang the lead on the Pepsi commercial), and Al Ferguson (who sang the lead on the Coty commercial).

=== Gary Usher & Co. ===
Gary Usher continued to mine this genre of music with numerous 'bands' made up of session musicians doing one-off recordings. They were from the conglomerate of session musicians known as the Wrecking Crew, which had a rotating lineup of the same basic people. For instance, if Hal Blaine was not the drummer, then it was Earl Palmer. These fictional bands issued recordings as the Sunsets, the Four Speeds, Gary Usher and the Usherettes (a.k.a. the Honeys), the Competitors, the Go-Go's, the Devons, the Ghouls, the Super Stocks, the Indigos, the Revells, the Kickstands and the Knights. Most of these have been re-issued on CD and are meticulously catalogued on Beach Boys fan sites.

Girard became a popular and pioneering CCM artist. Burns is the uncle of KCPR radio DJ and celebrity Biba Pickles.

== Go Little Honda ==
The first LP, Go Little Honda featured 11 tracks in addition to "Little Honda," all with a motorcycle theme. Richie Podolor contributed two tracks, "Haulin' Honda" and "Black Boots and Bikes." Mike Curb - who also wrote the song for Honda's "You meet the nicest people on a Honda" campaign - wrote the track "Rip's Bike." The remaining tracks, written by Gary Usher and Roger Christian, consist of "Mean Streak," "A Guy Without Wheels," "The Wild One," "Hot Rod High," "Death Valley Run," "Two Wheel Show Stopper," "Ridin' Trails" and "Hon-Da Beach Party."

== The Hondells ==
The group's second LP, titled simply The Hondells, was released only a few months after Go Little Honda. The LP yielded a Billboard 100 single, "My Buddy Seat," written by Brian Wilson and Gary Usher, backed with "You're Gonna Ride With Me," written by Usher and Roger Christian. Mike Curb wrote four songs that appear on the LP, "The Rebel (Without A Cause)," "The Lonely Rider," "Cycle Chase," and "The Sidewinder." The remaining tracks consisted of "Black Denim," "Night Rider," "My Little Bike," "Lay It Down," "He Wasn't Coming Back," and "Honda Holliday."

== In film ==
The Hondells can be seen in three different feature-length films, all from 1965: AIP's Beach Blanket Bingo (shown performing "Cycle Set" and shown providing back up on "Fly Boy"); AIP's Ski Party (shown performing "The Gasser" and heard performing the title track); and Paramount's Beach Ball (shown performing "My Buddy Seat"). The band is also credited with performing the title track for Columbia's 1965 film, Winter A-Go-Go.

== Discography ==
=== Albums ===
- Go Little Honda (1964) US: No. 119 Mercury Records SR 60940 (Stereo) / MG 20940 (Monaural)
- The Hondells (1964) US: Mercury Records SR 60982 (Stereo) / MG 209820 (Monaural)
- Greatest Hits (1996) Curb Records D2-77819

=== Singles ===
Year	Single	Chart Positions		
Year	Single	US	CAN	AU
1964	"Little Honda"	9	21	21
1964	"My Buddy Seat"	87	19	–
1965	"Little Sidewalk Surfer Girl"	–	24	–
1965	"Sea Of Love"	-	–	-
1965	"Sea Cruise"	131	–	-
1965	"Endless Sleep"	-	–	-
1966	"Younger Girl"	52	11	18
1966	"Kissin' My Life Away"	118	–	-
1966	"Cheryl's Going Home"	-	–	-
1967	" Yes To You"	-	–	-
1968	"Atlanta Georgia Stray"	-	–	-
1969	"Follow The Bouncing Ball"	-	–	-
1970	"Shine On Ruby Mountain"	-	–	-
