= Everybody (Tommy Roe song) =

Single by Tommy Roe

from the album Sweet Pea
- B-side: "Sorry I'm Late, Lisa"
- Released: September 14, 1963
- Genre: Pop rock
- Length: 1:56
- Label: ABC-Paramount Records 10478
- Songwriter(s): Tommy Roe
- Producer(s): Felton Jarvis

Tommy Roe singles chronology
"Kiss and Run" (1963)	"Everybody" (1963)	"Come On" (1964)

"Everybody" is a song written and performed by Tommy Roe. The song reached #3 on the Billboard Hot 100 and #9 on the UK Singles Chart in 1963. The song appeared on his 1966 album, Sweet Pea.

The song was produced by Felton Jarvis. The song was recorded at FAME Studios. The musicians on the record included Norbert Putnam on bass, David Briggs on piano, Bobby West on guitar, and Jerry Carrigan on drums.

The song was ranked #38 on Billboard magazine's Top Hot 100 songs of 1963.

== Other versions ==
- Ray Peterson released the song as a single in 1965.
- American Spring released a version of the song on their 1972 album, Spring.
- German rock group Asterix covered the song in 1970. The single version was included in the 1998 CD reissue of their album, Asterix.
