= Good Time (American Spring song) =

1972 song performed by American Spring

Single by American Spring

from the album Spring
- B-side: "Sweet Mountain"
- Released: May 1, 1972
- Recorded: 1970–1972
- Studio: Beach Boys Studio, Los Angeles
- Length: 2:49
- Label: United Artists
- Songwriters: Brian Wilson, Al Jardine
- Producers: Brian Wilson, Stephen Desper

American Spring singles chronology
"Now That Everything's Been Said" (1971)	"Good Time" (1972)	"Shyin' Away" (1973)

"Good Time"

Song by the Beach Boys

from the album The Beach Boys Love You
- Released: April 11, 1977
- Recorded: 1970
- Length: 2:50
- Label: Brother/Reprise
- Songwriters: Brian Wilson, Al Jardine
- Producer: Brian Wilson

"Good Time" is a song by American pop music duo American Spring from their 1972 album Spring. It was written by Brian Wilson and Al Jardine originally for the Beach Boys' album Sunflower (1970). In 1972, Spring released "Good Time" as their second single, recording their voices atop the Beach Boys' instrumental track. In 1977, the Beach Boys released their original version of the song on the album The Beach Boys Love You.

== Background ==
Jardine commented, "I co-wrote 'Good Time' with Brian; that's a typical Brian track. It was really a lot of fun doing that."

== Recording ==
=== Sunflower sessions ===
The basic track for "Good Time" was first recorded by the Beach Boys on January 7, 1970 at Brian Wilson's home studio with horns and strings overdubbed at a later date. David Sandler remembers that when the session players arrived to Wilson's home, "he went to his office and wrote horn charts while talking to me. It was an amazing horn line, with this overriding French horn riff, and he did the whole thing while having a conversation with me." The track was included on the provisional track listing for Add Some Music, but when that album and Reverberation were reconfigured by Warner Bros. Records into Sunflower, "Good Time" was not included.

During the tracking session for "Good Time", Brian or Bruce Johnston segued into a piano rendition of the Beatles' "You Never Give Me Your Money". Johnston could not remember who played the Beatles' song when approached for comment. In 2021, the recording was included as a track on the compilation Feel Flows.

=== Spring version ===
In the second quarter of 1972, Marilyn Wilson of American Spring overdubbed a lead vocal atop the backing track and backing vocals from The Beach Boys' 1970 session with further work done by producers Brian Wilson, David Sandler and Stephen Desper. This version of "Good Time" was issued as a single on May 1, 1972 and was later included on their début album Spring.

=== Love You version ===
The Beach Boys released an unadorned version of the original 1970 take of "Good Time" on their 1977 album The Beach Boys Love You. Wilson explained that he recycled the song for Love You because Spring had sold poorly, and he thought, "Maybe the exposure to that song to people might be good. Why waste a song?" Since the recording of "Good Time", Wilson's voice had deteriorated significantly, making it the only track on Love You in which his singing is not coarse.
