= At My Piano =

Studio album by Brian Wilson
- Released: November 19, 2021
- Studios: Spitfire; TomorrowLabs
- Genre: Easy listening
- Length: 48:04
- Label: Decca
- Producers: Brian Wilson; Nick Patrick

Brian Wilson chronology
Playback: The Brian Wilson Anthology (2017)	At My Piano (2021)	Brian Wilson: Long Promised Road (Original Motion Picture Soundtrack) (2021)

At My Piano is the eleventh studio album by American musician Brian Wilson, released on November 19, 2021 through Decca Records. It consists of instrumental re-recordings of songs from Wilson's back catalogue.

== Background and composition ==
"At My Piano" features Brian Wilson performing solo piano renditions of songs he had written in the past. Wilson commented in an interview that the album concept "wasn't my idea. The record company [Decca] brought the idea to us and it seemed interesting. So we tried it out. It is weird without vocals. [...] The label had a list of their choices [of songs], then I had mine and me and Darian [Sahanaja] just sort of picked what was best." With the exception of "Love and Mercy", all of the songs on the album were originally recorded by the Beach Boys. Half of the songs included dates from 1966 and earlier. The album includes a medley called "Sketches of Smile", which includes the songs "Our Prayer", "Heroes and Villains", "Wonderful", and "Surf's Up", all from the Smile project. For the medley, Sahanaja had Wilson play sections from Smile that were in C# and arranged it from there.

== Reception ==
Professional ratings
Aggregate scores
Source	Rating
Metacritic	68/100
Review scores
Source	Rating
AllMusic	3.5/5 stars
American Songwriter	2.5/5 stars
DownBeat	3.5/5 stars
Pitchfork	5.0/10
Under the Radar	8/10 stars

According to the review aggregator Metacritic, At My Piano received "generally favorable reviews" based on a weighted average score of 68 out of 100 from six critic scores. Austin Saalman on Under the Radar wrote that it was a "genuinely enchanting release". Bill Milkowski in DownBeat wrote: "To hear [Wilson's songs] rendered in such succinct and poignant fashion by the composer himself on solo piano is, as one friend and die-hard Wilson fan put it, 'a benediction'". Fred Thomas stated in AllMusic that while "the mellow, elevator music style of these versions doesn't sound any more significantly connected to Wilson... it's pleasant to hear these songs in a new form, and to realize Wilson's depths as an artist when he presents himself at his most minimal, and it's still preternaturally beautiful". In a more mixed review, Lee Zimmerman wrote in American Songwriter that "even diehards would be justified in viewing [At My Piano] as little more than a novelty". Stephen Thomas Erlewine wrote in a Pitchfork review that he believed Wilson did not "invest his playing with much personality, so these smooth sounds are about as memorable as a piano twinkling away in the background of a department store".

== Track listing ==
At My Piano track listing
No.	Title	Length
1.	"God Only Knows"	3:49
2.	"In My Room"	3:07
3.	"Don't Worry Baby"	3:39
4.	"California Girls"	3:16
5.	"The Warmth of the Sun"	3:27
6.	"Wouldn't It Be Nice"	2:56
7.	"You Still Believe in Me"	2:33
8.	"I Just Wasn't Made for These Times"	3:49
9.	"Sketches of Smile" (medley): "Our Prayer"; "Heroes and Villains" / "Wonderful" / "Surf's Up"	3:39
10.	"Surf's Up"	4:05
11.	"Friends"	3:18
12.	"'Til I Die"	2:14
13.	"Love and Mercy"	2:42
14.	"Mt Vernon Farewell"	1:14
15.	"Good Vibrations"	4:16
Total length:		48:04

== Personnel ==
Personnel taken from At My Piano liner notes.

- Brian Wilson – piano, producer
- Nick Patrick – producer, digital editing
- Darian Sahanaja – music director, co-producer, recording, digital editing
- Debbie Shair – recording
- Simon Rhodes – recording, mix engineer, digital editing
- Tim Debney – mastering
- Monument Media – cover art, design
- Pamela Littky – photography
