= He's a Doll =

Single by the Honeys
- B-side: "The Love of a Boy and Girl"
- Released: April 13, 1964
- Recorded: February 17, 1964
- Length: 2:08
- Label: Warner Bros.
- Songwriter(s): Brian Wilson
- Producer(s): Brian Wilson

The Honeys singles chronology
| "The One You Can't Have" (1963) | "He's a Doll" (1964) | "Tonight You Belong to Me" (1969) |

"He's a Doll" is a song by American girl group the Honeys that was written and produced by the Beach Boys' Brian Wilson. It was released as their fourth single on April 13, 1964, with the B-side "The Love of a Boy and Girl".

== Background ==
According to Marilyn Wilson-Rutherford, "Brian would always notice when we saw a cute guy we would say, 'He's such a doll' so he picked up on it and wrote one of the great songs for us. We feel it’s a classic with the Wrecking Crew jamming too. That track and arrangement is amazing!" She regarded it as the definitive song by the group, particularly for "the energy and the commitment of young imagination of the perfect boyfriend."

The song was heavily influenced by Phil Spector productions such as "Be My Baby" (1963) and features the same verse chord progression as "Da Doo Ron Ron" (1963). Diane Rovell remembered, "We had a ball doing 'He's a Doll' [...] That was our attempt at the Angels/Shangri-Las sound."

== Cover versions ==
- 1993 – Sonic Surf City, He's a Doll
