= Rocky Pamplin =

American bodyguard (1949–2022)

- Born: Rushton Pamplin; August 3, 1949; Youngstown, Ohio, U.S.
- Died: December 10, 2022 (aged 73); Orange, California, U.S.
- Occupations: Model, bodyguard of Brian Wilson

Rushton "Rocky" Pamplin (August 3, 1949 – December 10, 2022) was an American model who, together with Stan Love, was employed as a bodyguard and caretaker for the Beach Boys' Brian Wilson from 1977 to 1979.

== Background ==
Rushton Pamplin was born in 1949 in Youngstown, Ohio. He attended Newark High School in Newark, California. He attended the University of Oregon and the University of Hawaiʻi at Mānoa, where he played college football as a running back. He was drafted in 1971 NFL draft by the New Orleans Saints, chosen 5th in the 10th round (239th overall), but did not play in an NFL game, being cut in preseason.

Despite reports to the contrary, there is no evidence that Pamplin played for the Canadian Football League's Montreal Alouettes, as his name appears nowhere on their rosters for the relevant period.

Pamplin was the cover and centerfold model for the May 1976 issue of Playgirl.

== Caretaker to Brian Wilson ==
Pamplin was – along with Stan Love, a former NBA player and younger brother to Beach Boy Mike Love – hired as an extrajudicial warden for Beach Boy Brian Wilson, also the Loves' cousin. Love later claimed that he and Pamplin were asked "to prevent [Brian's brother and the band's drummer Dennis Wilson] from providing cocaine and other dangerous drugs to Brian Wilson."

Pamplin joined the band American Spring for one year in 1977. The band was fronted by Marilyn Wilson, with whom Pamplin was having an affair, and consisted of her sister Diane Rovell on vocals and Brian Wilson in a writing/producing role. Pamplin sang lead vocals on the unreleased track "California Feelin'", a song written by Brian Wilson and Steve Kalinich. He also co-wrote the song "It's Like Heaven" with Wilson and Diane Rovell for American Spring, which was later recorded by singer Shaun Cassidy for his album Under Wraps.

Pamplin and Stan Love were relieved of their services in January 1979. Love commented, "If Rocky hadn't been sleeping with her, we'd still be there."

In January 1981, Love and Pamplin followed Dennis to his house in Los Angeles. They observed Dennis consuming cocaine with several other people and kicked down the door posing as police officers. Love and Pamplin then chased Dennis and engaged, in Love's words, "one of the most brutal beatings ever." Dennis pressed charges, and in March, both Love and Pamplin agreed to a mutual restraining order. in a Santa Monica Superior Court. Love was fined $750 and Pamplin was fined $250 for the beating. Both were put on six months probation.

== Death ==
Pamplin died on December 10, 2022.

== Bibliography ==
- Gaines, Steven (1986). Heroes and Villains: The True Story of The Beach Boys. New York: Da Capo Press. ISBN 0306806479.
- Matijas-Mecca, Christian (2017). The Words and Music of Brian Wilson. ABC-CLIO. ISBN 978-1-4408-3899-6.
