= American Spring =

American pop music duo

- American Spring at Beach Boys Studio, 1972. From left: Brian Wilson, Marilyn Wilson, and Diane Rovell.

Background information
- Also known as: Spring (1971–1972)
- Origin: Los Angeles, California, U.S.
- Genre: Pop
- Years active: 1971–1973; 1977
- Labels: United Artists; Columbia
- Spinoff of: The Honeys
- Past members: Marilyn Wilson; Diane Rovell

American Spring (known as simply Spring before 1972) was an American pop music duo formed in Los Angeles, California. It consisted of sisters Marilyn Wilson and Diane Rovell, who had earlier been members of girl group the Honeys. As with the Honeys, Brian Wilson (Marilyn's then-husband) played an integral role with American Spring, producing some of their recorded material.

== Biography ==
=== Formation and early years ===
After Ginger Blake, cousin of Marilyn Wilson and Diane Rovell, left the Honeys to pursue a solo singing career in Las Vegas in 1970, the Honeys effectively dissolved as a group. In 1971, while in her sister's kitchen, Diane Rovell pushed the idea of continuing to create music with her sister Marilyn as a pop duo named "Spring". The band had their first official recording sessions at Brian Wilson's home studio in October 1971 and issued their first single "Now That Everything's Been Said" later that month. After releasing a second single, "Good Time" in May 1972, Spring released their first album, the self-titled Spring in July 1972. Spring did not sell well in its time, but has since become a sought-after collectible.

In late 1972, the band found some legal trouble as the UK based band Spring were threatening legal action, arguing they owned the rights to the use of the band's name. In order to avoid conflict, a compromise was made where Diane Rovell and Marilyn Wilson altered their band name to American Spring. A third band named Spring was also releasing music in Canada at this time.

After releasing a third single, "Shyin' Away" in 1973 the band went dormant.

=== Rebirth and later releases ===
In 1977, following Brian Wilson's resurgence as a producer, American Spring once again commenced recording at Brother Studios, this time with Rocky Pamplin contributing to certain sessions. Though a substantial amount of material was recorded, personal matters which included the divorce of Marilyn and Brian caused Spring to once more become largely inactive. Some of these songs from both 1973 and 1977 have since come to find release though anthologies, rereleases and compilations. Tracks like "Snowflakes", "(Just Like) Romeo and Juliet", "Do Ya?", "Slip On Through", "Don't Be Cruel" and "Sweet Sunday Kind of Love" are among this material.

Rhino Records issued an anthology of American Spring's music during 1988, and a 1992 Capitol Records Honeys collection included several previously-unissued American Spring songs. The Honeys also re-formed during the 1990s, to perform locally around Hollywood.

== Band members ==
- Diane Rovell – lead, harmony and backing vocals
- Marilyn Wilson – lead, harmony and backing vocals

== Discography ==
=== Studio albums ===
- Spring (July 1972)

=== Compilation albums ===
- Spring (1988) (US) (Rhino)
- Spring...Plus (1989) (UK) (See For Miles)
- Pet Projects: The Brian Wilson Productions (2003) (Ace)

=== Singles ===
- "Now That Everything's Been Said" / "Awake" (October 1971)
- "Good Time" / "Sweet Mountain" (May 1972)
- "Shyin' Away" / "Fallin' in Love" (April 1973)

== See also ==
- The Beach Boys – American band co-founded by Marilyn Wilson's ex-husband, Brian Wilson
