= And Your Dream Comes True =

Song by the Beach Boys

from the album Summer Days (And Summer Nights!!)
- Released: July 5, 1965
- Recorded: May 24, 1965; Columbia Recording Studio
- Genre: Pop
- Length: 1:04
- Label: Capitol
- Songwriter: Brian Wilson/Mike Love
- Producer: Brian Wilson

"And Your Dream Comes True" is an a cappella song written by Brian Wilson and Mike Love for the American rock band the Beach Boys. It was released on their 1965 album Summer Days (And Summer Nights!!).

== Background ==
On July 7, 1963, Wilson filed a copyright for a song tentatively called "Baa Baa Black Sheep" with a melody based on the nursery rhyme. The song later became "And Your Dream Comes True". Even though the song is just over a minute long, it was recorded in five sections (each one double-tracked) and edited together. Hawthorne, CA features part of the recording process of this song (the track "Wish That He Could Stay") as well as a stereo version of the song.

"And Your Dream Comes True" is one of two songs from Summer Days (And Summer Nights!!) never performed live by the Beach Boys (the other being "Girl Don't Tell Me"). However, the song has been performed live by Brian Wilson several times.

== Personnel ==
- Al Jardine – vocals
- Mike Love – vocals
- Brian Wilson – vocals
- Dennis Wilson – vocals
- Carl Wilson – vocals
- Bruce Johnston – vocals
- Chuck Britz – session engineer
