= The Surfer Moon =

1962 song by Bob & Sheri

Song by the Beach Boys

from the album Surfer Girl
- Released: 1963
- Recorded: 1963
- Songwriter: Brian Wilson
- Producer: Brian Wilson

"The Surfer Moon" (alternately known as "Summer Moon") is a song by American music duo Bob & Sheri that was released as a single in October 1962. It was written by Brian Wilson and was the first record in which he was officially credited for production. In 1963, Wilson recorded the song with his band the Beach Boys for their album Surfer Girl.

== Background ==
The song "Summer Moon" started out as a different title, "Surfer Moon" which was previously recorded by Bob Norberg & Sheri Pomeroy. In May 1963, Brian Wilson got together with some top Los Angeles session musicians who would later become The Wrecking Crew. This time Norberg recorded it with a local singer and future actress Victoria Hale, then known as Vickie Kocher. The song was recorded at United Recorders. Jan Berry took care of the string arrangements.. Having already rehearsed their vocals at Norberg's Crenshaw Park apartment, they recorded the song at the Western Studio. Brian Wilson's vocals were also added to the recording. A three track recording was done and Wilson had made a rough dub was made. Wilson also gave Kocher an acetate to have as a keepsake.

== Demo version ==
An early version of the song was released in 2013 for the compilation The Big Beat 1963. According to the Friday Night Boys blog, Victoria Hale, who possessed the only known acetate of "The Summer Moon", was contacted by Lee Dempsey of Endless Summer Quarterly magazine. He put Alan Boyd and Mark Linett in touch with her. It was arranged for her to hand-carry her acetate to a professional mastering studio to make a digital transfer from it.
