= Bob & Sheri (band) =

1960s pop duo consisting of Bob Norberg and Sheryl Pomeroy

- Also known as: Bob & Sherri
- Origin: California, U.S.
- Genres: pop; surf
- Years active: 1960s
- Label: Safari
- Past members: Bob Norberg; Cheryl Pomeroy

Bob & Sheri was an American pop duo consisting of Bob Norberg and Cheryl Pomeroy. They were early collaborators of Brian Wilson, leader and co-founder of the Beach Boys.

== Background ==
Bob Norberg (not to be confused with Bob Norberg, the recording engineer) was Brian Wilson's roommate in the 1960s, and Pomeroy was Norberg's girlfriend. Norberg and Pomeroy would perform as Bob and Sheri between the Beach Boys sets. For the group, Wilson produced "The Surfer Moon", described by writer David Leaf as a minor footnote in his musical legacy. In Dave Thompson's The Music Lover's Guide to Record Collecting, their single "Surfer Moon" is listed in the "Ten Top Collectable" surfing singles.

== Career ==
Norberg was a guitarist who played in a college rock'n roll trio with drummer Rich Miailovich and pianist Dave Boyle who were his two fellow Sigma Chi fraternity brothers at USC. They were a no-name band who played a few gigs. They backed Connie Stevens once when she visited the school. Backing Stevens, they played at the home of Gale Storm who was the mother of one of their fraternity brothers, Phillip Bonnell. Following Norberg's graduation in 1961 the trio had broken up with Norberg and Miailovich having drifted apart. Between June 1961 and Spring to Summer 1962, Norberg started dating Cheryl Pomeroy. This was also around the time that Brian Wilson met them.

On the 13th of September 1962, Wilson produced a session for the duo which resulted in the single "Surfer Moon" which was released in October that year on a record label which was owned by Wilson's father Murray. The single released on Safari 101 was backed with "Humpty Dumpty". It didn't make an impression in the charts but Wilson would later use the tune in another project. In addition to "Surfer Moon" and "Humpty Dumpty", another song was recorded with the duo. Norberg and Pomeroy co-wrote with Wilson a tune called "Recreation". The song, which was 1:55 long, was never released.

By May 1963, Sheri Pomeroy had left.

== Norberg's recording with Vicki Hale ==
In May 1963, Wilson had another crack at "Surfer Moon". Retitling the tune as "Summer Moon" he got together with some top Los Angeles session musicians who would later become The Wrecking Crew. Pairing Norberg with a local singer and future actress Victoria Hale, the song was recorded at United Recorders. The string arrangements were handled by Jan Berry. Prior to recording, Norberg and Vickie Kocher (a.k.a. Victoria Hale) had rehearsed their vocals at Norberg's Crenshaw Park apartment. Recording the song at the Western Studio, Brian Wilson's vocals were also added. Also attending the session was Murry Wilson (Brian's father) who was coaching Kocher and telling her to sing as if she was a young girl in her first love. A three track recording was done and Wilson had made a rough dub from that. He also gave Kocher an acetate to have as a keepsake. Wilson played a demo of the song to Lou Adler, but Alder didn't go for it. Wilson also recorded a demo of "Teach Me to Surf" which was going to be used for Norberg and Kocher. Kocher also added Lyrical assistance to another song, "Rock and Roll Bash" which Norberg and Wilson co-wrote. It was most likely never recorded as it didn't end up on The Big Beat album. Their version of "Summer Moon" didn't get released, but a version of the song with Norberg's guitar appeared on The Beach Boys 1963 Surfer Girl album. Norberg and Wilson also co-wrote “Your Summer Dream,” which appeared on that album. Hale would later become an actress, appearing in films such as That Tender Touch (1969), The Death Collector (1976) and One Down, Two to Go (1982). Having been given an acetate of the recording in 1963, Victoria Hale put the song online in fall 2010 for fans to enjoy. "Summer Moon" was never released on a label until decades later when it was included on Capitol's The Big Beat 1963 compilation, released in 2013. Some sites have the release with her last name spelled as Korcher. Elsewhere the song is credited to Bob Norberg, Victoria Hale.

According to the Friday Night Boys blog, Lee Dempsey of the Beach Boys fan publication Endless Summer Quarterly contacted Victoria Hale who possessed the only known acetate of "The Summer Moon". He got Alan Boyd and Mark Linett in touch with her. It was arranged for her to hand-carry her acetate to a professional mastering studio for a digital transfer to be made.

== Other Norberg work ==
Norberg and Brian Wilson also co-wrote and recorded a demo called “Back Home” in 1963. Brian and The Beach Boys revisited the song in 1970 and 1976. The 1970 version featured lyrics rewritten by Al Jardine but remained unreleased for decades, without a credit for Norberg. The 1976 version featured the original Wilson-Norberg lyrics and added Jardine's chorus, but did not include a credit for either in Norberg or Jardine. In 2021, the 1970 version and a live 1976 version were included on the box set Feel Flows, finally crediting Norberg alongside Wilson (but still without a credit for Jardine).

Norberg also wrote “Keep An Eye on Summer” with Wilson, which was recorded by The Beach Boys for their 1964 album Shut Down Volume 2 and re-recorded by Wilson in 1998 for his solo album Imagination.

Later Norberg was involved with a studio-only group called The Survivors which included Brian Wilson, Dave Knowlen and Richard Alarian. The single "Pamela Jean" bw "After The Game" was released on Capitol in 1964. He also became a commercial airline pilot.

== Discography ==
Singles
Group / Act	Release	Catalogue	Year	Notes #
Bob and Sheri	"The Surfer Moon" / "Humpty Dumpty"	Safari	(October 1962)	Original release
Bob and Sheri	The Surfer Moon / Humpty Dumpty	Safari 101	1980	Beach Boys Collectors Series Volume One; Reproduction

Compilation appearances
Title	Act	Catalogue	Year	Track	Notes #
Still I Dream of You: Rare Works of Brian Wilson	Various artists	Mm Records 409	1993	"The Surfer Moon, "Humpty Dumpty"	CD
Let's Go Surfin: The Birth of Surf	Various artists	Jasmine Records 8807572	2013	"The Surfer Moon" / "Humpty Dumpty"	2CD
The Big Beat 1963	Various artists	Capitol Records	2013	"The Big Beat", "Ride Away"	Digital © © 2013 Capitol Records, LLC
Surf Club [Original Surf & Beach Hits]	Various artists	10Ten Media / Zebralution	2017	"The Surfer Moon"	Digital
