= I'm Bugged at My Ol' Man =

1965 song by the Beach Boys

Song by The Beach Boys

from the album Summer Days (and Summer Nights!!)
- Released: June 28, 1965
- Recorded: May 24, 1965
- Studio: Columbia Studios, Hollywood
- Genre: Comedy rock; blues
- Length: 2:17
- Label: Capitol
- Songwriter: Brian Wilson
- Producer: Brian Wilson

"I'm Bugged at My Ol' Man" is a song written by Brian Wilson for the American rock band The Beach Boys. It was released on their 1965 album Summer Days (and Summer Nights!!). However, when Summer Days (and Summer Nights!!) was reissued in the early 1970s as California Girls, the track was cut from the running order.

== Background ==
"I'm Bugged at My Ol' Man" was inspired by Brian Wilson's tumultuous relationship with his father, Murry, who was well known for his abusive treatment of his children. In the song, the singer's father uses extreme punishments to reprimand minor incidents, resulting in the singer being locked in his room, his windows being boarded up, his surfboard and radio being taken away, his hair cut off, and a meager meal of bread crumbs and water being the only thing for him to eat.

== Critical opinion ==
AllMusic critic Thomas Ward said of the song, "'I'm Bugged at My Ol' Man' is one of the least complex songs in the Beach Boys' canon, yet it is not without its charms, even though group leader Brian Wilson was too embarrassed to own up to singing it on the album credits. What is essentially a Fats Domino-style boogie and some awful, trite lyrics ('Can't drive, can't do a doggone thing/I'm bugged at my ol' man/And he doesn't even know where it's at') is at least rendered bearable by some wonderfully primitive piano playing and, truth be told, a clichéd but gorgeous bridge that has Brian Wilson's stamp all over it." Author Peter Ames Carlin described the track as "a tossed-off piano blues number" and "one of the weirdest pieces of humor to ever turn up on anyone's album."

== Personnel ==
Credits from Craig Slowinski.

- Brian Wilson (Credited as "Too Embarrassed") – lead and backing vocals, piano
- Carl Wilson – backing vocals
- Dennis Wilson – backing vocals
- Marilyn Wilson – backing vocals
