= The Girl from New York City =

"The Girl From New York City"
- The Greek release of the song, as the B-side of "Wild Honey"

Song by The Beach Boys

from the album Summer Days (And Summer Nights!!)
- Released: June 28, 1965
- Recorded: May 24, 1965
- Genre: Rock
- Length: 1:54
- Label: Capitol
- Songwriter(s): Brian Wilson, Mike Love
- Producer(s): Brian Wilson

"The Girl from New York City" is a song written by Brian Wilson and Mike Love for the American rock band The Beach Boys. It was released on their 1965 album Summer Days (and Summer Nights!!). It was written as an answer song to The Ad Libs' hit from earlier that year, "The Boy from New York City".

== Other appearances ==
Aside from appearing on Summer Days (and Summer Nights!!), "The Girl from New York City" has since appeared on many other Beach Boys releases. The song was released in Greece as the B-side to "Wild Honey." The song also appeared on the UK version of compilation album, Best of The Beach Boys Vol. 2, as well as Capitol Years, another compilation album.

== Critical opinion ==
In a retrospective review, AllMusic writer Richie Unterberger wrote that "The Girl from New York City" was as "well done," but Unterberger felt that the track didn't "break new ground." Looking back at The Beach Boys' work in the mid-1960s, author Jim Fuselli described the track as a throwback "to the group's happy-go-lucky days."

== Personnel ==
The Beach Boys

Sourced from Craig Slowinski.

- Al Jardine – harmony vocals, backing vocals, Fender bass
- Bruce Johnston – backing vocals, upright piano
- Mike Love – lead vocals, bass vocals
- Brian Wilson – backing vocals
- Carl Wilson – backing vocals, 12-string lead guitar

Other

- Hal Blaine – drums
- Steve Douglas – baritone saxophone
- Jack Nimitz – baritone saxophone
- Clifford Hils – upright bass
- Ray Pohlman – Danelectro 6-string bass guitar
