= Chuck Girard =

American Christian musician (1943–2025)

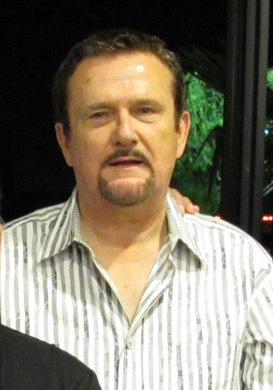
- Girard in 2010

Background information
- Born: August 27, 1943; Los Angeles, California, U.S.
- Died: August 11, 2025 (aged 81)
- Genres: Vocal quartet; Jesus music; surf rock; worship music; contemporary Christian
- Instruments: Piano; vocals
- Years active: 1961–2025
- Formerly of: Love Song; The Castells; The Hondells
- Website: www.chuckgirard.com

Chuck Girard (August 27, 1943 – August 11, 2025) was an American musician, considered a pioneer of Contemporary Christian music. He moved to Santa Rosa, California in his early teens, becoming a band member of the Castells and later the surf-rock band The Hondells.

In 1970, Girard, along with John Mehler, became a founding member of Love Song, one of the first Jesus Music groups in the United States.

In 1975, Girard became a solo artist after leaving Love Song. He wrote and performed the songs "Sometimes Alleluia" and "Rock 'N' Roll Preacher"; both were featured on his debut album Chuck Girard. It also featured the band Ambrosia prominently throughout. Girard in turn was featured on Ambrosia's albums Ambrosia and Somewhere I've Never Travelled, though the albums' credits do not indicate which tracks he contributed to or in what capacity.

He was the father of Alisa Childers, a member of the former Christian girl group ZOEgirl and Christian apologist.

In 2024, Girard was diagnosed with stage IV cancer that had metastasized to his lungs. He was taken off chemotherapy as it was ineffective. Girard died on August 11, 2025, at the age of 81.

== Discography ==
=== Secular albums ===
- The Castells So This Is Love (Era Records, 1961)
- The Best of the Castells (K-Tel, 2000)
- The Hondells Go Little Honda (Mercury Records, 1964)
- The Hondells (Mercury Records, 1964)
- The Hondells Greatest Hits (Curb Records, 1996)
- The Ghouls Dracula's Deuce
- Mr. Gasser & The Weirdos Silly Surfers
- The Revels The Go Sound of the Slots

=== Singles ===
The Castells

- "Make Believe Wedding" (1961) US No. 98
- "Sacred" (1961) US No. 20
- "So This Is Love" (1961) US No. 21

The Hondells

- "Little Honda" (1964) US: #9
- "My Buddy Seat" (1965) US: #87
- "Younger Girl" (1966) US: #52

=== With Love Song ===
- Love Song (Good News Records, 1972)
- Final Touch (Good News Records, 1974)
- "Feel the Love" (live double LP) (Good News Records, 1977)
- "Welcome Back" (CD) (Maranatha/Word, 1995)

=== Solo albums ===
- Chuck Girard (Good News Records, 1974)
- Glow in the Dark (Good News Records, 1976)
- Written on the Wind (Good News Records, 1977)
- Take it Easy (Good News Records, 1978)
- The Stand (Good News Records, 1980)
- The Name Above All Names (Seven Thunders Records, 1983)
- Fire & Light (Seven Thunders Records, 1991)
- Voice of the Wind (Seven Thunders Records, 1994)
- Heart of Christmas (Seven Thunders Records, 2001)
- Evening Shadows (Seven Thunders Records, 2008)
- "Moonrise Serenade" (Seven Thunders Records, 2024)

=== Compilations ===
- First Love (Exploration Films, 1998) – a concert film and documentary
