= Surfer Girl =

1963 album by the Beach Boys

Studio album by the Beach Boys
- Released: September 16, 1963
- Recorded: c. May 9 – July 16, 1963
- Studios: Western, Hollywood
- Genre: Surf
- Length: 25:30
- Label: Capitol
- Producer: Brian Wilson

The Beach Boys chronology
Surfin' U.S.A. (1963)	Surfer Girl (1963)	Little Deuce Coupe (1963)

The Beach Boys UK chronology
Best of the Beach Boys (1966)	Surfer Girl (1967)	Best of the Beach Boys Vol. 2 (1967)

Singles from Surfer Girl
- 1. "Surfer Girl" / "Little Deuce Coupe" Released: July 22, 1963

Surfer Girl is the third album by the American rock band the Beach Boys, released September 16, 1963 on Capitol Records. It is largely a collection of surf songs. The LP reached number seven in the U.S. and number 13 in the UK. Lead single "Surfer Girl", backed with "Little Deuce Coupe", was also a top-10 hit. It is also the band's first release with founding member Al Jardine since their debut single, "Surfin'".

This was the first album that officially credited Brian Wilson with production. It was also the first in which he used a string section (on "The Surfer Moon") and employed Wrecking Crew session musicians (on "Hawaii" and "Our Car Club"). Original member Al Jardine, who had been replaced by David Marks in February 1962, rejoined the band during the recording of this album and contributed to recording some of its songs. The band featured a six-man lineup from this point until Marks departed in October 1963.

Surfer Girl was certified gold by the RIAA in November 1965, indicating over 1,000,000 copies sold. In 2017, it was ranked the 193rd-greatest album of the 1960s by Pitchfork.

== Background ==
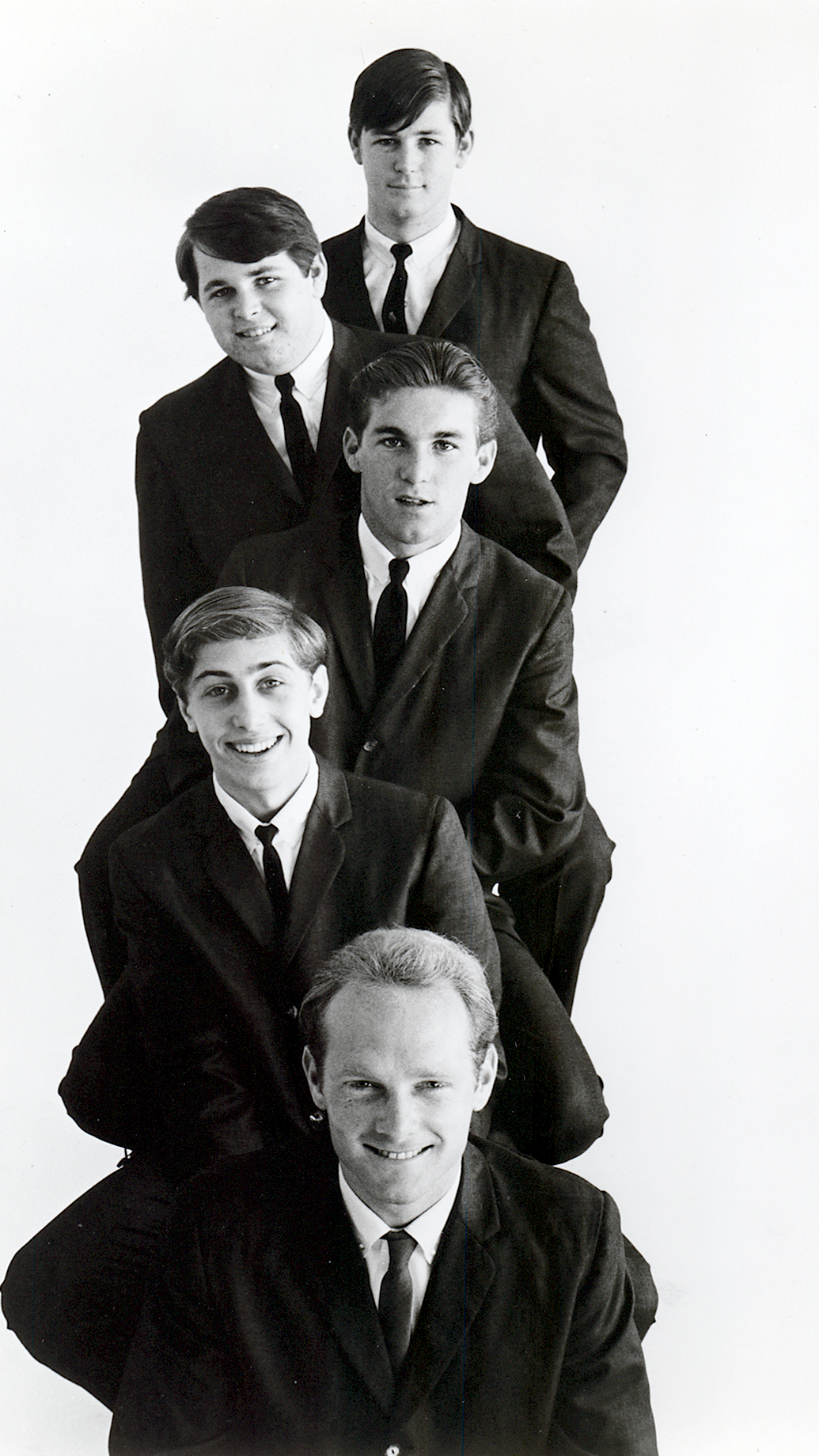
The Beach Boys at a March 1963 photoshoot. Here, they abandoned their former Pendleton image in favor of matching black suits. From top: Brian Wilson, Carl Wilson, Dennis Wilson, David Marks, Mike Love

The Beach Boys had become the pre-eminent vocal and instrumental group in America thanks to their hit single, "Surfin' U.S.A.", and the massive success of the following album of the same name. This granted Brian Wilson the leverage to convince Capitol to allow him full control over the band's productions, an unprecedented move in the music industry. Capitol signed Wilson's new girl group, the Honeys, which signaled the label's commitment to surf music.

In addition to his work with the Honeys, Wilson was focused on writing or production work with Jan and Dean and Bob Norberg. With Wilson still resistant to touring, he had ex-member Al Jardine rejoin the group as his replacement at the band's concerts from April ongoing. Jan and Dean released Jan & Dean Take Linda Surfing in the meantime, which featured the Wilson brothers and David Marks as guests on the tracks "Surfin'" and "Surfin' Safari".

== Production ==
Wilson produced Surfer Girl at Western Studio in Hollywood from around May 9 to July 16, 1963. He recalled some of the sessions lasting up to "nine and ten hours, unheard-of periods of time." The 1990 CD liner notes state that the album's 10 songs were recorded in one day, but this is unlikely, and since the American Federation of Musicians contracts have been lost, the exact dates and studios are not definitely known.

"The Surfer Moon" was the first Beach Boys recording with a string section. Having recruited members of the Wrecking Crew to help realize his productions with the Honeys, this album also marked the first occasion that those musicians were enlisted for certain Beach Boys tracks – specifically, on two songs, "Hawaii" and "Our Car Club". Mike Love's sister Maureen played harp on "Hawaii" and "Catch a Wave". Wilson considered “Catch a Wave” to feature his "first big Beach Boy vocal arrangement".

Other songs recorded in the middle of these sessions included the originals "Back Home", which was later remade for their 1976 album 15 Big Ones, and "Black Wednesday", which was later reworked as "Run-Around Lover" and recorded by singer Sharon Marie. These were Wilson's first recordings at Gold Star Studios.

== Songs ==
Three of the tracks are based on pre-existing compositions. "South Bay Surfer" is a rewrite of the Stephen Foster standard "Old Folks at Home". Wilson had also recorded that standard with the Honeys in another iteration as "Surfin' Down the Swanee River", and he revisited it as an instrumental introduction to "Ol' Man River" during the recording sessions for the 1968 20/20 album. "Boogie Woodie" is ostensibly based on Rimsky Korsakov's Flight of the Bumblebee. "The Rocking Surfer" is a reworking of the Tri-Fives' 1963 record "Come and Get It", an arrangement of the Czechoslovak folk song Stodola Pumpa (more popularly known in Southern California as the Good Humor ice cream truck jingle).

First verse of "Surfer Girl"
"Surfer Girl", a ballad, demonstrated that the band was more versatile than the Chuck Berry-inspired hits with which they had risen to fame.

Wilson is credited with writing the remaining nine songs on Surfer Girl. He wrote "Surfer Girl" and "The Surfer Moon" by himself, as well as four in conjunction with Mike Love ("Catch a Wave", "Hawaii", "Surfers Rule", and "Our Car Club"). He co-authored three songs individually with collaborators Gary Usher ("In My Room"), Roger Christian ("Little Deuce Coupe"), and Bob Norberg ("Your Summer Dream").

"Your Summer Dream" and "In My Room" are the only songs that do not relate to themes of cars or surfing. Wilson planned to omit the two car songs, "Our Car Club" and "Little Deuce Coupe", but this never happened due to Murry Wilson's wanting more hits on the album. His sway ensured the tracks would appear on both Surfer Girl and their next album, Little Deuce Coupe.

The lyrics to "Surfers Rule" feature a dig at the group's then-biggest rivals, the Four Seasons. The Four Seasons would respond with the song "No Surfing Today" on their album Born to Wander in early 1964.

== Cover photo ==
The front cover of the album depicts the five members of the band carrying a surfboard at Paradise Cove in Malibu, California. It was taken at the same session that produced the cover photo for their first album, Surfin' Safari (1962).

== Release ==
Lead single "Surfer Girl", backed with "Little Deuce Coupe", was issued in the U.S. on July 22, 1963, and reached number seven on the Billboard charts. After returning from a six-week tour at the end of August, they completed their next album, Little Deuce Coupe, in short time. The Surfer Girl album followed on September 16 and peaked at number seven on December 23. Little Deuce Coupe was released on October 7, just three weeks after Surfer Girl.

Surfer Girl was certified gold by the RIAA in November 1965. In the UK, the album was released by EMI Records in April 1967 and reached number 13. It had been held back from release due to the group's lesser popularity in Europe and was then issued to satisfy increased demand for new Beach Boys product.

In 1990, Capitol reissued the album on CD as a single-disc pairing with Shut Down Volume 2 (1964).

== Retrospective assessments ==
Retrospective professional reviews
Review scores
Source	Rating
AllMusic	3/5 stars
Blender	2/5 stars
Encyclopedia of Popular Music	3/5 stars
Rolling Stone	4/5 stars
The Rolling Stone Album Guide	4/5 stars

Surfer Girl was ranked number 193 on Pitchfork's list of the greatest albums of the 1960s. Highlighting tracks such as "In My Room" and "Surfer Girl", contributor Quin Moreland wrote in the entry that "Wilson began to probe the wistfulness at his core, hinting at further genius to come."

In Richie Unterberger’s review of the album in AllMusic, he highlights "In My Room" as the most significant track. He praises "Little Deuce Coupe" and "Catch a Wave", which he asserts "could have been a substantial hit single on its own merits", and the title track. The remainder of the album he disregards as "surprisingly mediocre filler". Unterberger called "Your Summer Dream" "the most interesting of the obscure tracks" due to its "unusual harmonies".

Music historian Scott Schinder identified Surfer Girl as an advancement in "Brian's continuing growth as a composer and producer." He cited "Catch a Wave" as Wilson's "most ambitious surf number to date" and "In My Room" as "a startling demonstration of Brian's willingness to confront his fears in song."

== Track listing ==
Side one
No.	Title	Writer(s)	Lead vocal(s)	Length
1.	"Surfer Girl"	Brian Wilson	B. Wilson	2:26
2.	"Catch a Wave"	B. Wilson; Mike Love	Love and B. Wilson	2:07
3.	"The Surfer Moon"	B. Wilson	B. Wilson	2:11
4.	"South Bay Surfer (The Old Folks at Home)"	Stephen Foster; B. Wilson; Dennis Wilson; Al Jardine	Love and B. Wilson	1:45
5.	"The Rocking Surfer"	B. Wilson	instrumental	2:00
6.	"Little Deuce Coupe"	B. Wilson; Roger Christian	Love	1:38

Side two
No.	Title	Writer(s)	Lead vocal(s)	Length
1.	"In My Room"	B. Wilson; Gary Usher	B. Wilson	2:11
2.	"Hawaii"	B. Wilson; Love	Love and B. Wilson	1:59
3.	"Surfer′s Rule"	B. Wilson; Love	D. Wilson with B. Wilson	1:54
4.	"Our Car Club"	B. Wilson; Love	Love and B. Wilson	2:22
5.	"Your Summer Dream"	B. Wilson; Bob Norberg	B. Wilson	2:27
6.	"Boogie Woodie"	traditional, arranged by B. Wilson	instrumental	1:56
Total length:				25:30

Surfer Girl / Shut Down Volume 2 1990/2001 CD reissue bonus tracks
No.	Title	Writer(s)	Lead vocal(s)	Length
13.	"Fun, Fun, Fun" (single version)	B. Wilson; Love	Love	2:21
14.	"In My Room" (German version)	B. Wilson; Usher	B. Wilson	2:20
15.	"I Do"	B. Wilson; Christian	Love and B. Wilson	3:06
Total length:				33:17

Notes

- Mike Love was not originally credited for "Catch a Wave" and "Hawaii". His credits were awarded after a 1994 court case.
- Some reissues of the album omit "Little Deuce Coupe" and "Our Car Club".

== Personnel ==
The Beach Boys

- Al Jardine - harmony and backing vocals, bass guitar, handclaps
- Mike Love - lead vocals, harmony and backing vocals, handclaps, possible saxophone
- Brian Wilson - lead vocals, harmony and backing vocals, piano, organ, bass guitar, producer, handclaps
- Carl Wilson - harmony and backing vocals, lead guitar, handclaps, possible bass and rhythm guitar
- Dennis Wilson - lead vocals, harmony and backing vocals, drums
- David Marks - rhythm guitar, possible harmony and backing vocals

Additional musicians and production staff

- Audree Wilson - organ on "In My Room"
- Maureen Love - harp on "Catch a Wave" and "Hawaii"
- The Wrecking Crew - instrumentals
- Chuck Britz - audio engineer

== Charts ==
Year	Chart	Position
1963	US Billboard 200	7
1967	UK Record Retailer	13
