= Summer Days (And Summer Nights!!) =

Studio album by the Beach Boys
- Released: July 5, 1965
- Recorded: February 24 – June 4, 1965
- Studios: Western, Gold Star, and Columbia, Hollywood
- Genre: Pop
- Length: 26:42
- Label: Capitol
- Producer: Brian Wilson

The Beach Boys chronology
| The Beach Boys Today! (1965) | Summer Days (And Summer Nights!!) (1965) | Beach Boys' Party! (1965) |

The Beach Boys UK chronology
| Pet Sounds (1966) | Summer Days (And Summer Nights!!) (1966) | Best of The Beach Boys (1966) |

Singles from Summer Days (And Summer Nights!!)
- 1. "Help Me, Rhonda" Released: April 5, 1965; 2. "California Girls" / "Let Him Run Wild" Released: July 12, 1965

Summer Days (And Summer Nights!!) is the ninth studio album by the American rock band the Beach Boys, released on July 5, 1965, by Capitol Records. The band's previous album, The Beach Boys Today! (released March 1965), represented a departure for the group through its abandonment of themes related to surfing, cars, and teenage love, but it sold below Capitol's expectations. In response, the label pressured the group to produce bigger hits. Summer Days thus returned the band's music to simpler themes for one last album, with Brian Wilson combining Capitol's commercial demands with his artistic calling. It is the band's first album with Bruce Johnston.

Produced by Wilson, Summer Days reached number two on the US Billboard 200 and number four on the UK Albums Chart. Two singles were issued from the album: "Help Me, Rhonda", which became the group's second chart-topper in the US, and "California Girls", which peaked at number three.

== Background ==
Carl Wilson reflected of Summer Days, "There was a time when it was uncool to be into the Beach Boys, and when we did that album, it started to bother us, doing this same stuff, because we thought we were trapped into having to sing about a certain thing."

== Unreleased material ==
One outtake from the album's sessions is known as "Sandy" or "Sherry She Needs Me", and was written by Brian Wilson with Russ Titelman. "Sherry She Needs Me" was revisited by the Beach Boys during 1976's The Beach Boys Love You sessions. The composition remained dormant until 1998, when it was finally finished by Wilson as "She Says That She Needs Me" for his 1998 Imagination solo album. The Beach Boys' version of "Sherry She Needs Me" was released in 2013 for the Made in California box set.

== Cover photo ==
The cover photo depicting the group on a sailboat shows Brian, Carl, and Dennis Wilson, and Mike Love. Al Jardine is missing from the photo, having missed the shoot due to illness.

Bruce Johnston is also not on the cover, although he did perform on the album and was present for the photo shoot. As Brian Wilson's stage replacement, he was not yet considered an official member, but Wilson appreciated Johnston's skills enough to have him contribute vocally and instrumentally on the album. Johnston would often accompany the group on photo shoots, but he was prohibited from having those pictures published on album covers due to a preexisting contract with Columbia Records.

== Reception ==
Professional ratings
Review scores
| Source | Rating |
|---|---|
| AllMusic | 4/5 stars |
| Blender | 4/5 stars |
| Encyclopedia of Popular Music | 4/5 stars |
| MusicHound | 4/5 |
| The Rolling Stone Album Guide | 2/5 stars |

Summer Days (And Summer Nights!!) proved to be another gold-selling success for the Beach Boys in the U.S., where it hit number 2 behind The Rolling Stones's Out of Our Heads. Along with 1963's Surfin' U.S.A. it remains the group's highest-charting studio album in the U.S. The following year, the album would reach number 4 in the United Kingdom. The album's lead single, "Help Me, Rhonda", topped the US Billboard Hot 100.

In a 2011 reappraisal, BBC Music observed that the track listing of Summer Days reads "like a Greatest Hits," and felt the album is unfairly disparaged for being "simply loaded with proud pop songs." Comparing to the Beach Boys' later work: "If Pet Sounds is the critics' favorite, Summer Days is perhaps the people's day at the beach." That same year, the online journal Rocksucker praised the album, ranking it 4th in its list of "Ten Underappreciated Beach Boys LPs," but considers it "an inconsistent collection of which the high points are truly great and the low points ranging from merely good to just-about-passing-muster."

== Release history ==
In the early 1970s, as part of Capitol Records' repackage series of their Beach Boys albums, Summer Days (And Summer Nights!!) was retitled California Girls and deleted two tracks: "Amusement Parks U.S.A." and "I'm Bugged at My Ol' Man". In 1990, the album was reissued paired with The Beach Boys Today!; this package featured extensive liner notes and bonus tracks from that period. In its 2012 reissue, the album received its first true stereo mix.

== Track listing ==
All tracks are written by Brian Wilson and Mike Love, except where noted.

Side one
| No. | Title | Lead vocal(s) | Length |
|---|---|---|---|
| 1. | "The Girl from New York City" | Mike Love | 1:54 |
| 2. | "Amusement Parks U.S.A." | Love and Brian Wilson | 2:29 |
| 3. | "Then I Kissed Her" (Phil Spector, Ellie Greenwich, Jeff Barry) | Al Jardine | 2:15 |
| 4. | "Salt Lake City" | Love and B. Wilson | 2:00 |
| 5. | "Girl Don't Tell Me" (B. Wilson) | Carl Wilson | 2:19 |
| 6. | "Help Me, Rhonda" | Jardine | 2:46 |

Side two
| No. | Title | Lead vocal(s) | Length |
|---|---|---|---|
| 1. | "California Girls" | Love and B. Wilson | 2:46 |
| 2. | "Let Him Run Wild" | B. Wilson | 2:20 |
| 3. | "You're So Good to Me" | B. Wilson | 2:14 |
| 4. | "Summer Means New Love" (B. Wilson) | instrumental | 1:59 |
| 5. | "I'm Bugged at My Ol' Man" (B. Wilson) | B. Wilson (credited as "Too Embarrassed" on back cover) | 2:17 |
| 6. | "And Your Dream Comes True" | group | 1:04 |
| Total length: | | | 26:42 |

The Beach Boys Today! / Summer Days (And Summer Nights!!) 1990/2001 CD reissue bonus tracks
| No. | Title | Lead vocal(s) | Length |
|---|---|---|---|
| 13. | "The Little Girl I Once Knew" (B. Wilson) | B. Wilson, Jardine with C. Wilson | 2:40 |
| 14. | "Dance, Dance, Dance" (alternate take) (B. Wilson, Carl Wilson, Love) | Love with B. Wilson | 2:02 |
| 15. | "I'm So Young" (alternate take) (William H. "Prez" Tyus, Jr.) | B. Wilson | 2:29 |
| 16. | "Let Him Run Wild" (alternate take) | B. Wilson | 2:18 |
| 17. | "Graduation Day" (Joe Sherman, Noel Sherman) | Love with B. Wilson | 2:18 |
| Total length: | | | 38:29 |

Notes

- Mike Love was not originally credited for "The Girl from New York City", "Amusement Parks U.S.A.", "Salt Lake City", "Help Me, Rhonda", "California Girls", "Let Him Run Wild", and "You're So Good to Me". His credits were awarded after a 1990s lawsuit.

== Personnel ==
Sourced from Musician's Union AFM contract sheets and surviving session audio, documented by Craig Slowinski.

The Beach Boys

- Al Jardine – lead, harmony and backing vocals; electric rhythm guitar; bass guitar; handclaps
- Bruce Johnston – harmony and backing vocals; acoustic grand piano, Hammond organ, celeste; castanets; handclaps
- Mike Love – lead, harmony and backing vocals; handclaps
- Brian Wilson – lead, harmony and backing vocals; bass guitar; acoustic upright piano; Hammond organ; timpani; handclaps
- Carl Wilson – lead, harmony and backing vocals; lead, rhythm, acoustic and 12-string guitar; bass guitar; handclaps
- Dennis Wilson – harmony and backing vocals; drums, tambourine, handclaps

Guests

- Ron Swallow – tambourine

Session musicians

- Israel Baker – violin
- Arnold Belnick – violin
- Hal Blaine – drums, timbales
- Glen Campbell – electric guitar
- Frank Capp – vibraphone
- Roy Caton – trumpet
- Jerry Cole – twelve-string guitar
- Al De Lory – organ
- Joseph DiFlore – viola
- Steve Douglas – tenor saxophone
- James Getzoff – violin
- William Hinshaw – French horn
- Harry Hyams – viola
- Plas Johnson – tenor saxophone
- Carol Kaye – electric bass guitar
- Bernard Kundell – violin
- Jay Migliori – baritone saxophone
- Leonard Malarsky – violin
- Jack Nimitz – bass saxophone
- Ray Pohlman – bass guitar
- Lyle Ritz – upright bass
- Howard Roberts – guitar
- Leon Russell – piano
- Billy Lee Riley – harmonica
- Ralph Schaeffer – violin
- Sid Sharp – violin
- Billy Strange – rhythm guitar, ukulele; tambourine
- Tommy Tedesco – lead guitar on "Summer Means New Love"
- Julius Wechter – claves
- Tibor Zelig – violin

Technical

- Chuck Britz – engineer

== Charts ==
| Year | Chart | Position |
|---|---|---|
| 1965 | US Billboard 200 | 2 |
| 1966 | UK Top 40 Albums | 4 |
