= Brian Wilson Reimagines Gershwin =

Studio album by Brian Wilson
- Released: August 17, 2010
- Recorded: October 2009 – February 2010
- Genre: Traditional pop
- Length: 39:04
- Label: Walt Disney
- Producer: Brian Wilson

Brian Wilson chronology
That Lucky Old Sun (2008)	Brian Wilson Reimagines Gershwin (2010)	In the Key of Disney (2011)

Singles from Brian Wilson Reimagines Gershwin
- 1. "The Like in I Love You" Released: August 2010

Brian Wilson Reimagines Gershwin is the eighth studio album by Brian Wilson, released on August 17, 2010 by Walt Disney Records as part of the Disney Pearl Series. The album consists of covers of ten George and Ira Gershwin songs, bookended by passages from Rhapsody in Blue, along with two new songs completed from unfinished Gershwin fragments by Wilson and band member Scott Bennett.

The cover artwork is an homage to the album cover for the 1958 jazz LP Sonny Clark Trio by Sonny Clark.

== Background ==
In the summer of 2009, Walt Disney Records approached Wilson about recording his own arrangements of songs from Disney films; however, Wilson first wanted to record an album of Gershwin covers, which the label agreed to support. He and band member Paul Mertens picked the songs to record based on Wilson's vocal range, and which ones he thought he could sing "appropriately."

In addition to the covers, the Gershwin estate granted Wilson access to over 100 unfinished Gershwin songs and fragments for the project to use for new material. Two songs were completed by Wilson and Scott Bennett (who provided lyrics) mainly based on two fragments: "Will You Remember Me", which was originally written in 1924 for the musical Lady, Be Good, was completed as "The Like in I Love You", while "Say My Say", which was unfinished by the Gershwin brothers in 1929, was completed as "Nothing But Love".

Recording of the album began at the start of 2010. Wilson served as producer, with Mertens writing out the arrangements as well as the linking pieces between tracks. The instrumental tracks were produced using his backing band, who also supplied backing vocals; however, the Rhapsody in Blue harmonies that bookend the album were done entirely by Wilson. According to Mertens, Wilson would spend eight hours a day in the studio perfecting vocal tracks. Elaborating on Wilson's role as arranger, Mertens said:

I tried to prepare the band as much as possible for the songs by writing skeletal arrangements from my meetings with Brian. The band tracks were cut live in the studio. So the band would start playing and get the song up and walking around. Then Brian would start to do his thing. He’d hear what people were doing and say, "Can you play that up an octave?" Bass drop out here…That’s how he works best. Or he has it completely done in his mind. He’s done that too, where he has come to a sound check and goes, "Here’s your vocal part, you play this." Since the Gershwin music was new material it was helpful to have the song in front of him so he could manipulate and move things around the way he wanted.

Mixing took place in the spring. Walt Disney Records' reaction to the final product was positive, though they hired recording engineer Al Schmitt to remix the original tracks that were recorded by Mark Linett and prepared by Wilson.

== Release and reception ==
Professional ratings
Aggregate scores
Source	Rating
Metacritic	66/100
Review scores
Source	Rating
AllMusic	4/5 stars
Billboard	4/5 stars
Entertainment Weekly	B+
The Guardian	1/5 stars
Los Angeles Times	3/4 stars
Mojo	3/5 stars
PopMatters	6/10 stars
Rolling Stone	3.5/5 stars
Slant Magazine	4/5 stars
Spin	8/10

On June 28, 2010, "The Like In I Love You" was released for streaming on Wilson's website in advance of the album's release. The album was released on CD on August 17, 2010, while a limited edition vinyl version of the album was released on August 24, 2010. Upon its release, it charted at number 26 on the Billboard 200, falling to 53 in the second week. It also reached number 1 on Amazon.com and the Billboard Jazz Albums chart.

Critical reaction was generally positive. Adam Gershwin, George Gershwin's great-nephew, stated that "[the songs on the album are] unlike anything I’ve heard before, but I would expect nothing less from Brian." Rolling Stone described the album as "lovely, weird, subtly psychedelic symphonic lounge music." In particular, the album's arrangements were praised for their uniqueness. Allmusic's John Bush wrote, "As usual, Wilson's musical instincts are impeccable, and with a full orchestra lending additional weight to these songs, it's easily the best production on a Brian Wilson record since 2004's SMiLE." Certain songs, such as "I Got Rhythm" and "They Can't Take That Away From Me," were noted for their Beach Boys' influences. The new songs completed by Wilson and Bennett were also generally well-received; GQ described "Nothing But Love" as "suitably celestial".

Some reviews, however, were less favorable, mostly concerning the quality of the arrangements. Stephen Holden of The New York Times wrote, "On an album that feels like a posthumous competition, Mr. Wilson emerges the clear loser." Michael Hann of The Guardian was particularly critical of the covers, describing the songs as being "reconfigured into pastiches of past Wilson classics."

== Track listing ==
No.	Title	Writer(s)	Length
1.	"Rhapsody in Blue/Intro"	George Gershwin	1:07
2.	"The Like In I Love You"	G. Gershwin, Brian Wilson, Scott Bennett	3:20
3.	"Summertime"	G. Gershwin, DuBose Heyward, Dorothy Heyward, Ira Gershwin	3:13
4.	"I Loves You, Porgy"	G. Gershwin, Du Bose Heyward, Dorothy Heyward, I. Gershwin	3:38
5.	"I Got Plenty o' Nuttin'"	G. Gershwin, Du Bose Heyward, Dorothy Heyward, I. Gershwin	2:45
6.	"It Ain't Necessarily So"	G. Gershwin, Du Bose Heyward, Dorothy Heyward, I. Gershwin	3:58
7.	"'S Wonderful"	G. Gershwin, I. Gershwin	2:48
8.	"They Can't Take That Away from Me"	G. Gershwin, I. Gershwin	2:51
9.	"Love Is Here to Stay"	G. Gershwin, I. Gershwin	2:59
10.	"I've Got a Crush on You"	G. Gershwin, I. Gershwin	2:41
11.	"I Got Rhythm"	G. Gershwin, I. Gershwin	2:43
12.	"Someone to Watch Over Me"	G. Gershwin, I. Gershwin	3:06
13.	"Nothing But Love"	G. Gershwin, Wilson, Bennett	3:24
14.	"Rhapsody in Blue/Reprise"	G. Gershwin	0:38

iTunes bonus track
No.	Title	Writer(s)	Length
15.	"Let's Call The Whole Thing Off"	G. Gershwin, I. Gershwin	2:39

== Personnel ==
Personnel taken from the album's liner notes.

Brian Wilson Band

- Brian Wilson – lead vocals
- Jeffrey Foskett – vocals
- Darian Sahanaja – vocals, piano, electric piano, clavinet, xylophone, Moog, vibraphone, tack piano, glockenspiel, organ, harpsichord
- Scott Bennett – vocals, vibraphone, piano, keyboards, xylophone, drums (track 13)
- Paul Von Mertens – vocals, clarinet, celeste, harmonica, bass harmonica, saxophone, flute, alto flute
- Probyn Gregory – vocals, guitar, theremin, banjo, trumpet, wah wah guitar, acoustic guitar, baritone guitar, slide guitar, nylon string guitar
- Nick Walusko – vocals, guitar
- Nelson Bragg – vocals, percussion, glockenspiel, timpani
- Brett Simons – electric bass, acoustic bass, baritone guitar, 6-string bass
- Gary Griffin – organ, piano
- Taylor Mills – vocals
- Todd Sucherman – drums (tracks 3–12)
- Mike D'Amico – drums (track 2)

Orchestra

- Paul Von Mertens – conductor, orchestration
- Brian Wilson – orchestration
- Peter Kent – violin, concertmaster
- Sharon Jackson – violin
- Jessica Van Velzen – viola
- Erika Dule-Kirkpatrick – cello
- Cameron Stone – cello
- Rudy Stein – cello
- Peggy Baldwin – cello
- Andy Martin – trombone
- Bill Liston – woodwinds
- Dan Higgins – woodwinds
- Probyn Gregory – French horn

Technical personnel

- Brian Wilson – producer, arrangements
- Al Schmitt – mixing
- Mark Linett – recording engineer

== Charts ==
Chart performance for Brian Wilson Reimagines Gershwin
Chart (2010)	Peak position
Australian Albums (ARIA)	95
Dutch Albums (Album Top 100)	84
German Albums (Offizielle Top 100)	86
Swedish Albums (Sverigetopplistan)	44
UK Albums (OCC)	55
US Billboard 200	26
