= Catch a Wave =

Song by the Beach Boys

from the album Surfer Girl
- Released: September 16, 1963
- Recorded: June 12 and July 14, 1963
- Studio: Western, Hollywood
- Genre: Surf rock
- Length: 2:11
- Label: Capitol
- Songwriters: Brian Wilson; Mike Love
- Producer: Brian Wilson

Licensed audio
- "Catch a Wave" on YouTube

"Catch a Wave" is a song written by Brian Wilson and Mike Love for the American rock band the Beach Boys, released on their 1963 album Surfer Girl.

In 1964, a rewritten version of the song was recorded by Jan and Dean as "Sidewalk Surfin'". It was released as a single and reached No. 25 on the Billboard Hot 100.

== Personnel ==
=== The Beach Boys ===
- Al Jardine – bass guitar, vocals
- Mike Love – lead vocals
- David Marks – rhythm guitar
- Brian Wilson – organ, piano, lead vocals
- Carl Wilson – lead guitar, vocals
- Dennis Wilson – drums, vocals

=== Additional musicians ===
- Maureen Love – harp

== Other recordings ==
DTV set the original Beach Boys recording to the Disney shorts Hawaiian Holiday and How to Swim and was featured on the Groovin' for a '60s Afternoon video.

The Kidsongs Kids released their version of "Catch a Wave" on their The Wonderful World of Sports video.

The Rock-afire Explosion covered the song on their first show tape.
