= In the Key of Disney =

Studio album by Brian Wilson
- Released: October 25, 2011
- Recorded: 2011
- Studios: Ocean Way Recording; Henson Recording
- Length: 37:24
- Label: Walt Disney
- Producer: Brian Wilson

Brian Wilson chronology
Brian Wilson Reimagines Gershwin (2010)	In the Key of Disney (2011)	The Big Beat 1963 (2013)

Professional ratings
Review scores
Source	Rating
AllMusic	3/5 stars
NME	8/10

In the Key of Disney is the ninth studio album by Brian Wilson, released on October 25, 2011, by Walt Disney Records as part of the Disney Pearl Series. The album is the second release by Disney for Wilson, after Brian Wilson Reimagines Gershwin. Disney calls it "the album that marries the vision of two men who shaped the image of modern California – Brian Wilson & Walt Disney."

== Background ==
In the summer of 2009, Walt Disney Records approached Wilson about recording his own arrangements of songs from Disney films, which Wilson agreed to do after recording an album of Gershwin covers.

In The Key of Disney was recorded in early 2011. After recording the album Wilson indicated that "The Beach Boys sound and the Disney people make a fantastic collaboration. I tried to do justice to all their songs."

Amazon.com initially offered two bonus tracks; one appeared on the compact disc version of the album, and the other appeared on the MP3 version.

== Track listing ==
No.	Title	Writer(s)	Length
1.	"You've Got a Friend in Me" (from Toy Story)	Randy Newman	2:40
2.	"The Bare Necessities" (from The Jungle Book)	Terry Gilkyson	3:12
3.	"Baby Mine" (from Dumbo)	Frank Churchill; Ned Washington	3:28
4.	"Kiss the Girl" (from The Little Mermaid)	Alan Menken; Howard Ashman	3:53
5.	"Colors of the Wind" (from Pocahontas)	Menken; Stephen Schwartz	3:59
6.	"Can You Feel the Love Tonight" (from The Lion King)	Elton John; Tim Rice	3:39
7.	"We Belong Together" (from Toy Story 3)	Newman	3:56
8.	"I Just Can't Wait to Be King" (from The Lion King)	John; Rice	3:37
9.	"Stay Awake" (from Mary Poppins)	Sherman Brothers	2:48
10.	"Heigh-Ho / Whistle While You Work / Yo Ho (A Pirate's Life for Me)" (from Snow White and the Seven Dwarfs / Pirates of the Caribbean)	Churchill; Larry Morey; /: Churchill; Morey; /: George Bruns; Xavier Atencio	3:27
11.	"When You Wish Upon a Star" (from Pinocchio)	Leigh Harline; Washington	2:45

Amazon bonus tracks
No.	Title	Writer(s)	Length
12.	"A Dream Is a Wish Your Heart Makes" (from Cinderella)	Mack David; Al Hoffman; Jerry Livingston	2:51
13.	"Peace on Earth" (from Lady and the Tramp)	Peggy Lee; Sonny Burke	2:12

== Personnel ==
- Brian Wilson – lead vocals (all tracks); vocal arrangements, band arrangements, producer
- Jeffrey Foskett – vocals (all tracks); 12-string guitar (3), electric guitar (4, 8, 10), acoustic guitar (5, 6, 9), toy instruments (10)
- Darian Sahanaja – vocals (all tracks); Moog synthesizer (1), marimba (2, 10), organ (3), vibraphone (3), piano (7), harpsichord (9), 8-bit bicycle horn (10), toy instruments (10), celeste (11)
- Scott Bennett – vocals (all tracks); drums (1, 8), marimba (2), piano (4), Hammond B-3 organ (5, 11), vibraphone (6, 7, 9), synthesizer (10), toy instruments (10)
- Probyn Gregory – slide guitar (track 1), trumpet (1, 2), banjo (2), electric 12-string guitar (3, 8), electric guitar (4, 5, 11), nylon string guitar (6, 9), acoustic guitar (7), guitar solo (8), ukulele (10), Tannerin (11)
- Nick Walusko – vocals, electric guitar (all tracks); toy instruments (10)
- Paul Von Mertens – saxophone (tracks 1, 3, 4, 8), clarinet (2), wooden flute (5), flute (6), baritone saxophone (7), alto flute (9), piccolo (10), bass harmonica (10); band arrangements
- Brett Simons – bass (tracks 1, 3–5, 7–9, 11), acoustic bass (2, 6, 10)
- Mike D'Amico – drums (tracks 2–7, 9–11)
- Nelson Bragg – percussion (all tracks)
- Gary Griffin – B3 organ (tracks 1, 4, 8, 10), piano (1, 3, 5, 6, 11), accordion (11)
- Chris Bleth – oboe (tracks 6, 11)
- Leslie Stevens – musical saw (track 10)
- Mark Linett – recording engineer
