= Stan Love (basketball) =

American basketball player (1949–2025)

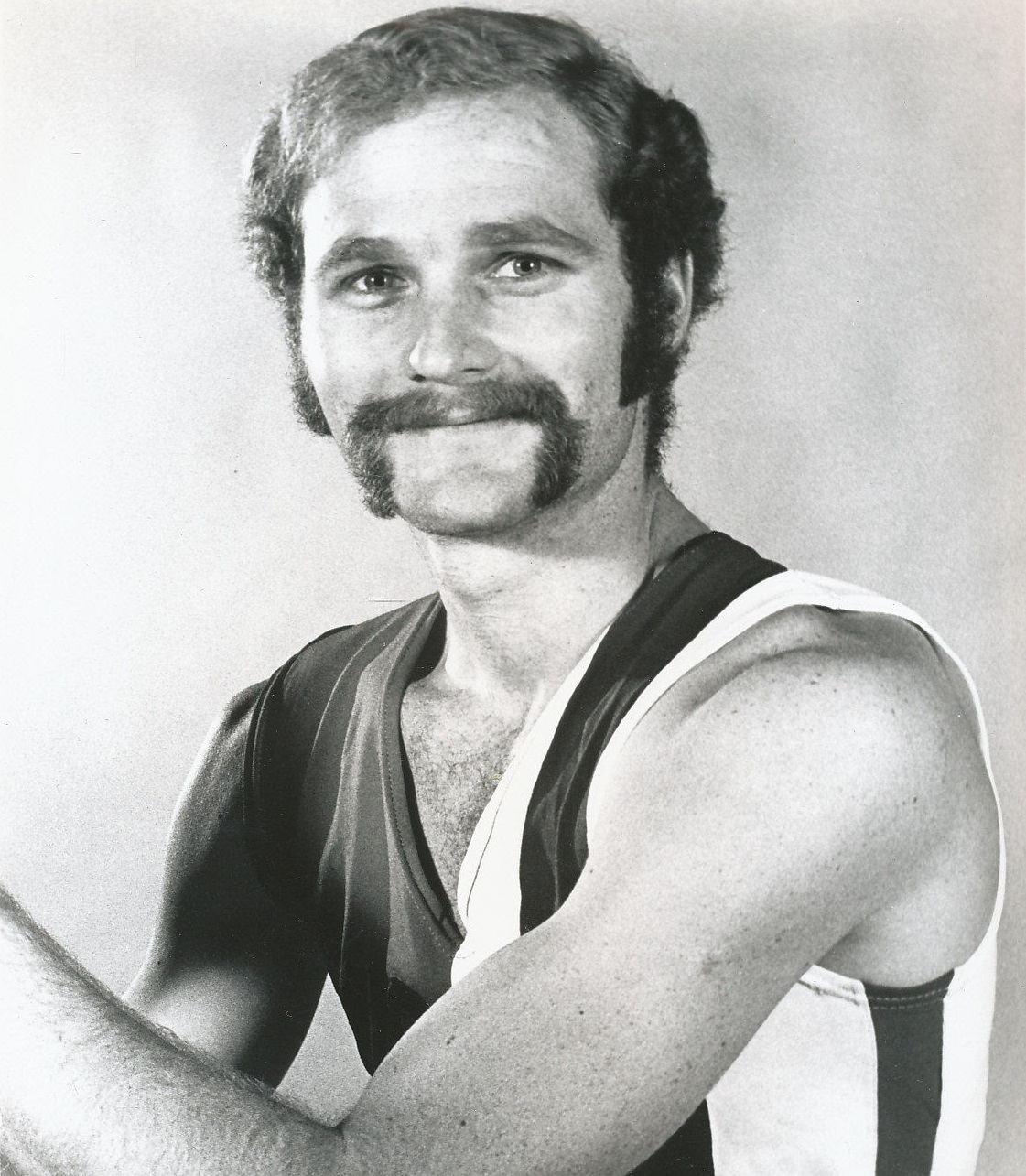
- Love in 1972

Personal information
- Born: April 9, 1949 Los Angeles, California, U.S.
- Died: April 27, 2025 (aged 76)
- Listed height: 6 ft 9 in (2.06 m)
- Listed weight: 215 lb (98 kg)

Career information
- High school: Morningside (Inglewood, California)
- College: Oregon (1968–1971)
- NBA draft: 1971: 1st round, 9th overall pick
- Drafted by: Baltimore Bullets
- Playing career: 1971–1975
- Position: Power forward
- Number: 13, 34

Career history
- 1971–1973: Baltimore Bullets
- 1973–1975: Los Angeles Lakers
- 1975: San Antonio Spurs

Career highlights
- 2× First-team All-Pac-8 (1970, 1971); Second-team All-Pac-8 (1969)

Career NBA and ABA statistics
- Points: 1,579 (6.6 ppg)
- Rebounds: 929 (3.9 rpg)
- Assists: 181 (0.8 apg)
- Stats at NBA.com
- Stats at Basketball Reference

Stanley S. Love (April 9, 1949 – April 27, 2025) was an American professional basketball player in the National Basketball Association (NBA) and American Basketball Association (ABA). He played college basketball for the Oregon Ducks.

Love was the father of basketball player Kevin Love and the younger brother of Beach Boys singer Mike Love. During the late 1970s, Stan was also employed as a bodyguard, trainer, and assistant to the Beach Boys' Brian Wilson, the Loves' cousin.

== Background ==
Love grew up in the Baldwin Hills area of Los Angeles and was the fourth of six children to Milton Edward Love, a union sheet metal worker, and Emily Glee Wilson Love, a singer. His older brother is Mike Love. Mike, along with cousins Brian, Carl, and Dennis Wilson, later formed the Beach Boys.

== Basketball career ==
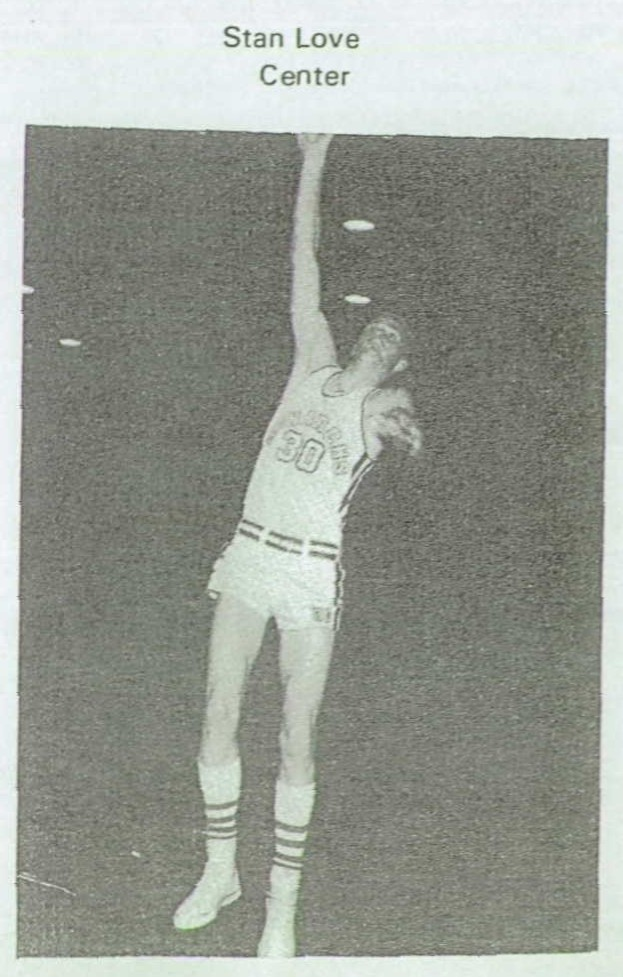
Love in 1967

A 6'9" forward, Love graduated from Morningside High School (where he was a center in his senior year), Inglewood, California, then played collegiately for the Oregon Ducks from 1968 to 1971.

Love was the 9th pick in the 1971 NBA draft, chosen by the Baltimore Bullets. He was also selected by the Dallas Chaparrals in the 1971 ABA draft. He had also been selected in the 1970 ABA Draft by the Texas Chaparrals while still an underclassman.

Love had a four-year professional career with Baltimore, the Los Angeles Lakers of the National Basketball Association, and the San Antonio Spurs, then of the American Basketball Association. He retired from the sport in 1975, with per-game averages of 6.6 points, 3.9 rebounds and 2.5 fouls for 14.7 minutes in 239 career games.

Love was inducted into the University of Oregon Athletics Hall of Fame in 1994.

== Caretaker to Brian Wilson ==
In the late 1970s, Love, alongside professional model Rocky Pamplin, was employed as a full-time "keeper" to his cousin, Brian Wilson, in an effort to make Brian more productive for The Beach Boys, often by physical force. Love's brother Mike is a founding member of The Beach Boys. In 1982, Love and Pamplin were fined $750 and placed on six months' probation for a home invasion and assault on group member Dennis Wilson. In 1990, Love filed a petition to be appointed Brian Wilson's conservator, partly resulting in the court-ordered severing of personal and financial ties between Wilson and his therapist Eugene Landy in 1991.

== Personal life and death ==
Love married Karen in 1986 and was the father of three children, including, NBA champion Kevin Love, who has played for the Minnesota Timberwolves, Cleveland Cavaliers, and Miami Heat. Love resided in Lake Oswego, Oregon.

Stan Love died following a long, degenerative illness on April 27, 2025, at the age of 76.

Love was the brother of musician Mike Love and Pink Martini harpist Maureen Love.

== Career statistics ==
Legend
GP	Games played	GS	Games started	MPG	Minutes per game
FG%	Field goal percentage	3P%	3-point field goal percentage	FT%	Free throw percentage
RPG	Rebounds per game	APG	Assists per game	SPG	Steals per game
BPG	Blocks per game	PPG	Points per game	**Bold**	Career high

=== NBA/ABA ===
==== Regular season ====
Year	Team	GP	MPG	FG%	3P%	FT%	RPG	APG	SPG	BPG	PPG
1971–72	Baltimore (NBA)	**74**	**17.9**	**.451**		.736	**4.6**	.7			**7.9**
1972–73	Baltimore (NBA)	72	13.8	.436		**.790**	4.2	.6			6.4
1973–74	L.A. Lakers (NBA)	51	13.7	.428		.766	3.3	**.9**	**.5**	**.4**	5.6
1974–75	L.A. Lakers (NBA)	30	14.4	.438		.712	3.2	**.9**	**.5**	**.4**	7.2
1974–75	San Antonio (ABA)	12	5.3	.433	–	.750	2.0	.8	.0	.3	2.4
Career (NBA)		227	15.2	.440		.751	4.0	.8	.5	.4	6.8
Career (NBA & ABA)		239	14.7	.440	–	.751	3.9	.8	.5	.4	6.6

==== Playoffs ====
Year	Team	GP	MPG	FG%	FT%	RPG	APG	SPG	BPG	PPG
1972	Baltimore (NBA)	**4**	3.5	.250	–	**1.5**	.3			.5
1973	Baltimore (NBA)	1	**7.0**	.000	–	1.0	.0			.0
1974	L.A. Lakers (NBA)	2	4.5	**.667**	**.667**	**1.5**	**.5**	.5	.0	**3.0**
Career		7	4.3	.300	.667	1.4	.3	.5	.0	1.1
