= Salt Lake City (song) =

Song by the Beach Boys

from the album Summer Days (And Summer Nights!!)
- Released: July 5, 1965
- Recorded: March 30 – May 1965
- Studio: Western and Columbia, Hollywood
- Genre: Rock
- Length: 2:00
- Label: Capitol
- Songwriter(s): Brian Wilson; Mike Love
- Producer(s): Brian Wilson

Licensed audio
- "Salt Lake City" on YouTube

"Salt Lake City" is a song written by Brian Wilson and Mike Love for the American rock band the Beach Boys. It was released on their 1965 album Summer Days (And Summer Nights!!).

== Background ==
"Salt Lake City" was written to call attention to the band's major fan base in the city of the same name. From 1963 until 1973, the Beach Boys performed at Utah's Lagoon Amusement Park's Patio Gardens at least twelve times, and Utah was one of the earliest places that the Beach Boys' music was played outside of California. KNAK DJ Gene Davis said, "[Brian Wilson] remembered coming to Salt Lake, but it was not a big deal. When you talk to Mike Love, Salt Lake was big time to them. He loved Salt Lake City. But [Wilson] remembered writing 'Salt Lake City' as one of those fun songs they sat down and did." The song was also released as a promo single, backed with "Amusement Parks U.S.A.", by the city's downtown merchants association.

The song lyrics extol the attractions of northern Utah: summer sun, winter skiing, local girls and the Lagoon amusement park. Mike Love and Brian Wilson sing the leads vocals on the song.

== Critical opinion ==
AllMusic writer Richie Unterberger called the song a "subpar effort" as well as one of the "throwbacks to the empty-headed summer filler of previous days" on Summer Days (And Summer Nights!!). Author Jim Fuselli described the track as a throwback "to the group's happy-go-lucky days."

== Personnel ==
Partial credits via Craig Slowinski.

The Beach Boys

- Al Jardine – harmony and backing vocals
- Mike Love – lead and bass vocals
- Brian Wilson – lead, harmony, and backing vocals
- Carl Wilson – harmony and backing vocals, electric guitar
- Dennis Wilson – harmony and backing vocals

Additional musicians and staff

- Hal Blaine – drums
- Leon Russell – Hammond B-3 organ
- Frank Capp – vibraphone
- Roy Caton – trumpet
- Jerry Cole – electric rhythm guitar
- Al De Lory – grand piano
- Steve Douglas – tenor saxophone
- Plas Johnson – tenor saxophone
- Jay Migliori – baritone saxophone
- Carol Kaye – Danelectro 6-string bass guitar
- Lyle Ritz – upright bass
- Howard Roberts – 12-string electric guitar
- Billy Strange – tambourine
