= The Castells =

American musical group

- Original group c. 1961 (top left, clockwise): Ussery, Hicks, Girard, Kelly

Background information
- Origin: Santa Rosa, California
- Genres: Rock, vocal, jazz
- Years active: 1959–1965
- Labels: Era, Warner Bros., Decca
- Past members: Bob Ussery; Tom Hicks; Joe Kelly; Chuck Girard; Greg Van Krugel; Warren Hays; Jeff Bush

The Castells were a male vocal quartet from Santa Rosa, California, best remembered for their hits "Sacred" (No. 20 in 1961) and "So This Is Love" (No. 21 in 1962), both released as singles by Era Records. Their sound blended light rock with elements of collegiate vocal harmony and jazz.

== History ==
The Castells were formed at Santa Rosa High School around 1959. They were booked for a performance at a local teenage "canteen". They did not have a name and their pianist, Jeff Bush, suggested one. It had no meaning other than they thought that it sounded good, and the intent was to be more thoughtful and change it later.

Through a Santa Rosa KJAX disc jockey who went by the name of Dan Dillon, they got Hollywood contacts. Chuck Girard's mother financed a demo for a hundred dollars, which was recorded in a San Francisco studio. They took their demo and went door-to-door in Hollywood, first to Crystalette Records, which seemed to be defunct, Aladdin Records, and then Era Records. They were excited that Aladdin seemed interested, as they considered themselves to be R&B, but eventually it was Era who signed them.

Their first release, "Little Sad Eyes", went to "Bubbling Under" on the Billboard chart, then came "Sacred", which reached the charts, peaking at No. 20 in the early summer of 1961. "Make Believe Wedding" went "Bubbling Under", then "So This Is Love" again charted, reaching No. 21 in the spring of 1962. They played shows for a few years, and shared the stage with Jackie Wilson, Jerry Lee Lewis, Bobby Vee, and Brenda Lee. They never charted again but did continue to record for a few years, first for Warner Bros. Records and then Decca Records. They disbanded around 1964. Chuck Girard later joined the surf rock group The Hondells and, in the 1970s, became a popular CCM artist.

== Members ==
Final group members: Van Krugel, Kelly, Hicks, Girard

Castells live: Van Krugel, Girard, Kelly, Hicks

The band's original members were Chuck Girard, Tom Hicks, Warren Hays, Bob Ussery, and Jeff Bush. Bush did not sing, but played piano on all the gigs. Hays left when the group was signed by Era Records. The group planned to move from Santa Rosa to southern California. Hays, a minor, was not allowed to move with the boys, and his parents also objected on religious grounds. When Hays left, Joe Kelly replaced him. When the group signed with Era Records, label president Herb Newman insisted on session pianists, and Jeff Bush was edged out.

In 1963 Bob Ussery got married, left the group, and moved out of California. He was temporarily replaced by Greg Van Krugel, Chuck Girard's roommate and high school friend, because he knew the material from attending rehearsals. After a few live performances as a substitute, he was elected to permanent membership. By late 1964, The Castells were still recording and doing public appearances, but their popularity was waning. By 1965 the group members remained friends but went their separate ways.

Most often produced by Gary Usher, Chuck Girard and Joe Kelly went on to record as a duo under their real names, Chuck and Joe, recording blue-eyed soul covers of earlier popular songs like "Harlem Shuffle" and "Feel So Fine." They recorded a few edgy pop-folk singles as the Devons. They worked for Usher for several years and recorded a number of hot rod and surf albums under many different group identities.

Tom Hicks began a family with a new wife and went on to become a successful businessman in southern California.

Greg Van Krugel also married. He was drafted into the U.S. Army in 1966. In 1968, after active duty, he returned to his wife and daughter in southern California and made his career in the defense and aerospace electronics industry.

Other performers of note with whom the Castells shared the stage include Bobby Rydell, Dick and Dee Dee, Jan and Dean, The Beach Boys, The Righteous Brothers. The Rivingtons, Donnie Brooks, Dobie Gray, Gary Lewis & The Playboys, Ted Neely and Larry Verne.

Session musicians the Castells worked with later became known as The Wrecking Crew. They included Billy Strange (guitar), Barney Kessel (guitar), Ray Pohlman (bass and arranger of one of the group's sessions), Frankie Capp (percussion), Plas Johnson (saxophone), Glen Campbell (guitar), and Hal Blaine (drums).

== Discography ==
=== Singles ===
Year	Title	Peak chart positions		Record Label	B-side	Album
Year	Title	US Pop	US AC	Record Label	B-side	Album
1961	"Little Sad Eyes"	101	—	Era	"Romeo"	So This Is Love
1961	"Sacred"	20	—	Era	"I Get Dreamy"	So This Is Love
1961	"Make Believe Wedding"	98	—	Era	"My Miracle"	So This Is Love
1961	"The Vision of You"	—	—	Era	"Stiki De Boom Boom"	So This Is Love
1962	"So This Is Love"	21	10	Era	"On the Street of Tears"	So This Is Love
1962	"Oh! What It Seemed to Be"	91	—	Era	"Stand There, Mountain"	So This Is Love
1962	"Echoes in the Night"	—	—	Era	"Only One"	
1962	"Eternal Love, Eternal Spring"	—	—	Era	"Clown Prince"	
1963	"Initials"	—	—	Era	"Little Sad Eyes"	
1963	"Some Enchanted Evening"	—	—	Era	"What Do Little Girls Dream Of"	So This Is Love
1964	"I Do"	—	—	Warner Bros.	"Teardrops"	
1964	"Could This Be Magic"	—	—	Warner Bros.	"Shinny up Your Own Side"	
1964	"Tell Her if I Could"	—	—	Warner Bros.	"Love Finds a Way"	
1965	"An Angel Cried"	—	—	Decca	"Just Walk Away"	
1966	"Life Goes On"	—	—	Decca	"I Thought You’d Like That"	

== In popular culture ==
The Castells version of "Some Enchanted Evening" from the musical South Pacific was used in episode 1 of the Fallout TV series, during a slow-motion battle scene within Vault 33 between the Vault Dwellers and Raiders who had infiltrated the Vault whilst dressed as members of Vault 32.

"Little Sad Eyes" was used at the end of season 1 episode 3 of the TV series What We Do In The Shadows.
