= Spring (English band) =

English progressive rock band

Spring were an English progressive rock band from Leicester.

They released only one album in their career, a self-titled LP in May 1971. Spring's music is notable for the use of the mellotron, with three of its five members credited with playing that instrument on the album. Songs for a second album were recorded but not released at the time. They were later released on CD together with some demos as Untitled 2, as a bonus CD on the Esoteric CD release of 2015, and as a bootleg vinyl album Spring 2 (with Roger Dean cover). Three of the tracks were used as bonus on the single CD edition of the first album.

== Background ==
=== Members ===
Spring originally consisted of Pat Moran (vocals), Ray Martinez (guitars), Kips Brown (keyboards), Pick Withers (drums) and Adrian Moloney (bass), with former members Terry Abbs (drums), Tony Hughes (guitar), Graham Bevin (keyboards), Denis Nolan (lead) all of whom had previously played in various local Leicester bands.

== Career ==
A turning point in Spring's fortunes happened after a gig in Cardiff, when the band's van broke down somewhere in the Welsh countryside, coincidentally very near where producer/engineer Kingsley Ward had recently set up Rockfield Studios. Ward would later marvel at the "coincidence of meeting a group with a broken down truck in your own home town when you have previously spent months traipsing around the country in search of talent". He was particularly intrigued by the fact that they owned a mellotron, and "invited them down the following week for an audition with my brother Charles and myself", the outcome of which was "good enough for us to want to be involved with them". Several demo sessions followed.

Pat Moran and the band came to Rockfield Studios and were auditioned by Charles Kingsley. He decided to manage the band. Gus Dudgeon ended up producing their album which was released on the RCA/Neon label on 21 May 1971. The album was reviewed in the 19 June 1971 issue of Melody Maker. The reviewer noted the treble fold-out cover and was a bit cautious putting the record on the turntable. But there was a pleasant surprise in store with the thick mellotron sounds. The album was recommended for late night listening. The lyrics were called a little heavy going and pretentious, but the reviewer said that they mostly come off.

In spite of supporting Velvet Underground on a UK tour, plus Keith Christmas and The Sutherland Brothers on various dates, the band broke up in 1972 following aborted attempts at recording a second album. Two previously unreleased songs from these sessions (featuring new bassist Peter Decindis) appeared on The Laser's Edge's 1992 CD reissue of the album, along with "Fool's Gold" from the first album sessions.

== Later years ==
Moran later worked as sound engineer at Rockfield Studios, notably for Van der Graaf Generator and Robert Plant; he died in early 2011. Martinez became an in-demand session guitarist, working with the likes of Alkatraz, Michael Chapman, Gypsy, Tim Rose and Robert Plant. He also wrote Cliff Richard's 1982 hit "The Only Way Out". Pick Withers later became the drummer for Dire Straits, playing on their first four records. Kips Brown became a session musician, playing with Andy Fairweather Low and others, and was in a later band called Wellington. Adrian Moloney returned to the Midlands, where he worked alongside several well-known artists and groups. A solo career as a jobbing musician and minor impresario took him all over the Midlands, and also to Tenerife for several summer seasons. He was working right up to his death in 2010.

Pat Moran became a notable record producer and worked with Lou Gramm, Robert Plant, Iggy Pop, Edie Brickell and the new Bohemians, as well as many others.

On 25 May 2015, a double CD of Spring was released on Esoteric Records, a part of Cherry Red Records.

== Spring's self-titled album (1971) ==
=== Track listing ===
All tracks written by Spring.

1. "The Prisoner (Eight By Ten)" - (5:34)
2. "Grail" - (6:44)
3. "Boats" - (1:53)
4. "Shipwrecked Soldier" - (5:08)
5. "Golden Fleece" - (6:59)
6. "Inside Out" - (4:49)
7. "Song To Absent Friends (The Island)" - (2:47)
8. "Gazing" - (5:54)
  - The following three tracks were added in the CD edition
9. "Fools Gold" - (6:25) (1st album outtake)
10. "Hendre Mews" - (7:09) (from unreleased 2nd LP)
11. "A World Full Of Whispers" - (3:57) (from unreleased 2nd LP)

=== Personnel ===
- Pat Moran - vocals, mellotron
- Ray Martinez - 6- and 12-string guitars, mellotron
- Kips Brown - piano, organ, mellotron
- Adrian "Bone" Moloney - bass
- Pick Withers - drums, glockenspiel

=== Reception ===
Paul Stump's 1997 History of Progressive Rock describes the band as "over-rated", while acknowledging that their sole released album has some merits: "... its spacious and supple musical explorations into relatively sedate artistic territory (undemonstratively poppish motifs, textbook rock solo developments) possess an emotional punch lent by the tasteful use of Mellotron, showcasing one of the most notable deployments of the instrument anywhere on record."
