= The Honeys =

American girl group

- From left: Ginger Blake, Diane Rovell, and Marilyn Wilson

Background information
- Also known as: The Rovell Sisters (1958-1963); The Usherettes (1963); Ginger & the Snaps (1965)
- Origin: Los Angeles, California, U.S.
- Genres: Vocal surf
- Years active: 1958–1969, 1980, 1983, 1986, 1990s, 2016, 2019–2021
- Labels: Capitol, Warner
- Spinoffs: American Spring
- Past members: Diane Rovell; Marilyn Wilson-Rutherford; Barbara Rovell; Ginger Blake

The Honeys (originally the Rovell Sisters) were an American girl group, formed in Los Angeles in 1958, that initially comprised sisters Marilyn, Diane, and Barbara Rovell. Barbara was later replaced by their cousin, Ginger Blake. After 1962, the Rovell Sisters were rechristened "the Honeys" by the Beach Boys' Brian Wilson, who envisioned the group as a female counterpart to his band. Wilson served as the Honeys' record producer and chief songwriter, and later married Marilyn in late 1964.

The Honeys were described as "the world's first female surfing vocal combo" by Music Vendor in April 1963. After 1969, they remained mostly inactive. In the 1970s, Marilyn and Diane formed another short-lived group, American Spring, also with participation from Wilson.

== Background ==
The Honeys (a slang term for girls or girlfriends, and specifically for female surfing enthusiast) consisted at first of sisters Barbara, Diane and Marilyn Rovell, performing under the name of the Rovell Sisters. Their cousin Sandra Glantz later replaced Barbara, and joined the group as Ginger Blake.

They were discovered on the amateur talent show circuit by producer Gary Usher, who featured Blake on his 1961 single "You’re the Girl"/"Driven Insane", and the whole band as the Usherettes in 1963 on "Three Surfer Boys"/"Milky Way."

Marilyn and Diane had met the Beach Boys when the boys performed at a Hollywood club called Pandora's Box in late 1962. Usher presented the band to frontman Brian Wilson, who started their collaboration by changing their name to the Honeys, after a line from the Beach Boys' "Surfin' Safari". Brian and Marilyn (who was still in high school) began dating, and he took the girls into the recording studio to produce their songs.

He brought the Beach Boys in as backing vocalists on "Surfin' Down the Swanee River," and the Honeys as backup performers on Beach Boys records: the cheerleader voices on the re-recording of "Be True to Your School" were performed by the Honeys, and the two groups sometimes shared the same concert bill.

They were also known as Ginger and the Snaps for a one-off single on MGM Records in 1965 ("Seven Days in September" / "Growing Up is Hard to Do" - MGM K13413). Marilyn appeared on a 1965 single on A&M Records by the Westwoods ("I Miss My Surfer Boy Too" / "Will You Love Me (Like You Did Last Summer)" - A&M 763), along with Gracia Nitzsche, wife of Jack Nitzsche.

== Career ==
In 1963 and 1964, the Honeys released a number of singles on Capitol and Warner Bros., with minimal to modest regional success. A planned Honeys album on Capitol was scrapped when the company's A&R director Nick Venet left the company in mid-1963. The songs were either written, arranged, or produced by Brian Wilson. Among their other studio work, they sang background vocals for the Beach Boys on the hit "Be True to Your School", for Bruce Johnston on the title song from his album, Surfin' Round the World, and for Jan and Dean on the hit singles "The New Girl in School", "Dead Man's Curve", and "The Little Old Lady from Pasadena".

The Honeys' career faded as surfing music went out of vogue. Marilyn and Brian were married and became the parents of Carnie and Wendy Wilson, who later found fame as members of Wilson Phillips. Blake left the band to create her own publishing company and pursue her solo backing career. Marilyn and Diane reteamed as a duo called American Spring during the 1970s, also under the production eye of Brian Wilson.

On December 31, 1980, the Honeys and Jan and Dean performed with the Beach Boys. Later in the 1980s, the band reunited to record two studio albums, Ecstasy and It's Like Heaven.

During the 1990s, the Honeys reunited and performed locally around Los Angeles. An anthology CD of their music (including several American Spring recordings) was released by Capitol Records in 1992. The Honeys sing in The Tribe, a revolving group of Los Angeles musicians and singers that includes Stephen John Kalinich, Freebo, Fuzzbee Morse, Gary Stockdale, Grant Geissman, Carly Smithson, Rosemary Butler, Marc Mann, Gary Griffin, and Band Manager Lauri Reimer.

On March 10, 2016, two of the Honeys participated in concert at the Coffee Gallery Backstage in Altadena, California, as part of a tribute to their long-time friend, P.F. Sloan.

== Members ==
- Marilyn Wilson-Rutherford (1961–1969, 1980, 1983, 1986, 1990s, 2016)
- Diane Rovell (1961–1969, 1980, 1983, 1986, 1990s)
- Ginger Blake (Between 1961 and 1963–1969, 1980, 1983, 1986, 1990s, 2016)
- Barbara Rovell (1961–1963)

== Discography ==
=== Singles ===
- 1963: "Shoot the Curl"/"Surfin' Down the Swanee River"
- 1963: "Pray for Surf"/"Hide Go Seek"
- 1963: "The One You Can't Have"/"From Jimmy with Tears"
- 1963: "Three Surfer Boys"/"Milky Way" (with Gary Usher; as Gary Usher and the Usherettes)
- 1963: "Miss My Little Surfer Boy" (as The Westwoods; unreleased)
- 1964: "He's a Doll"/"The Love of a Boy and a Girl"
- 1969: "Tonight You Belong to Me"/"Goodnight, My Love"

=== Studio albums ===
- 1983: Ecstasy
- 1986: It's Like Heaven

=== Compilation albums ===
- 1992: Capitol Collectors Series: The Honeys
- 2001: The Honeys Collection
- 2003: Pet Projects: The Brian Wilson Productions
- 2013: The Big Beat 1963
- 2014: Sessions '64
