= Marilyn Wilson-Rutherford =

American singer and first wife of Brian Wilson

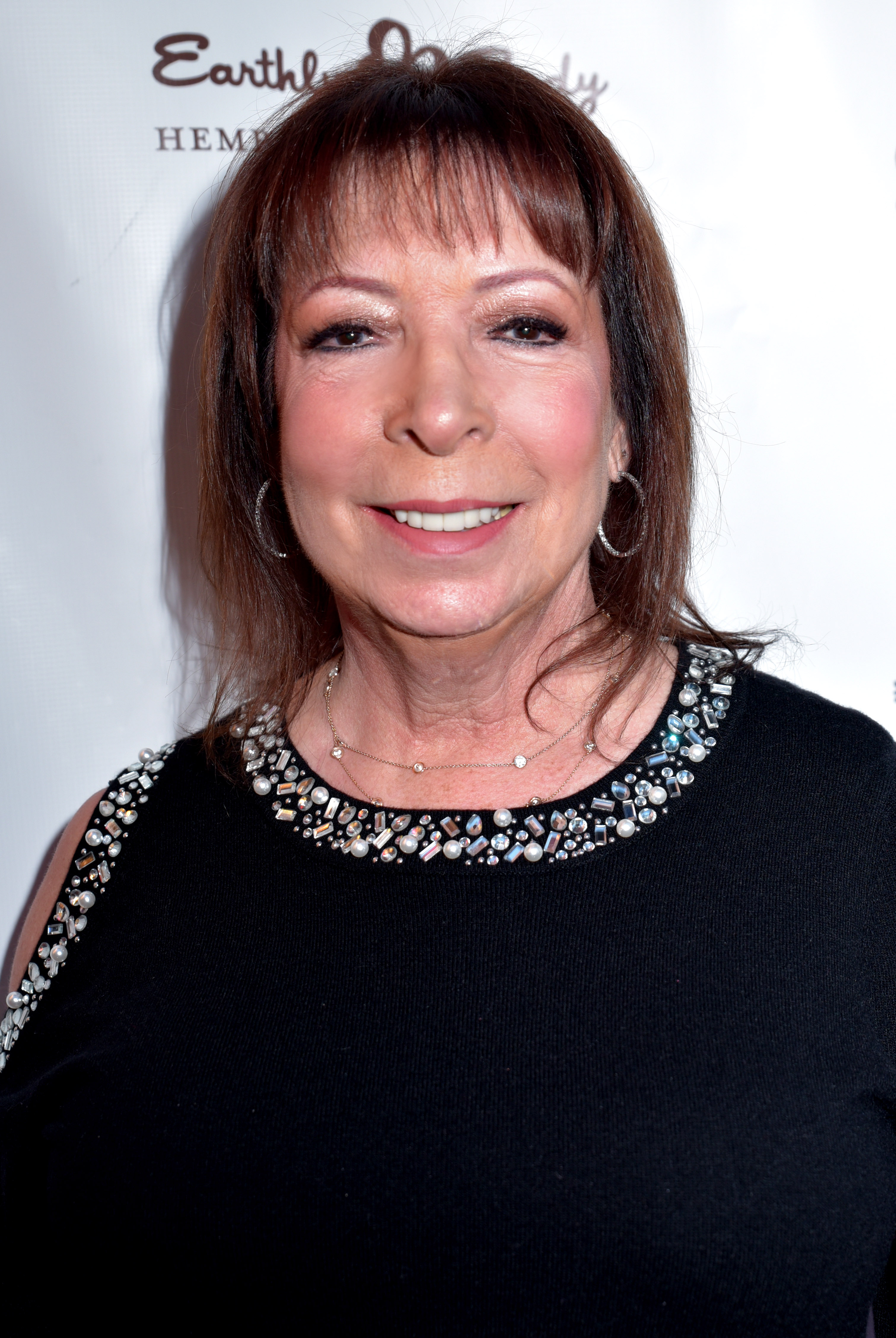
- Wilson-Rutherford in 2019

Background information
- Also known as: Marilyn Wilson
- Born: Marilyn Rovell; February 6, 1948 (age 78); Chicago, Illinois, U.S.
- Origin: Los Angeles, California, U.S.
- Genre: Pop
- Occupation: Singer
- Instrument: Vocals
- Years active: 1958–present
- Formerly of: The Honeys; American Spring
- Spouse(s): Brian Wilson (m. 1964; div. 1979) Daniel Rutherford (m. 2000)

Marilyn Wilson-Rutherford (née Rovell; born February 6, 1948) is an American singer who is best known as the first wife of Beach Boys co-founder Brian Wilson. She was also a member of two girl groups, the Honeys in the 1960s and American Spring in the 1970s.

Raised in Los Angeles, Marilyn started her singing career in the late 1950s, initially as part of a family singing trio, the Rovell Sisters, with her siblings Diane and Barbara. Through a mutual connection with musician Gary Usher, Marilyn met Brian at a Beach Boys concert in August 1962. Brian subsequently renamed the Rovell Sisters to "the Honeys" and wrote and produced several of their records.

Marilyn married Brian in December 1964 and together had two children, Carnie and Wendy Wilson, who later formed two-thirds of Wilson Phillips. The couple's early marital struggles were reflected in the melancholic lyrical content from the Beach Boys' 1966 album Pet Sounds (particularly the songs "Caroline, No" and "You Still Believe in Me"). In 1971, she and Diane formed American Spring, with Brian again acting as producer and songwriter.

Marilyn and Wilson divorced in 1979. She continues to occasionally perform concerts with the Honeys.

== Background ==
Marilyn Rovell was born on February 6, 1948, in Chicago, the second daughter of Mae Gausmann and Irving Rovell (originally Rovelski). Her father was the owner and operator of a hand laundry. She has two sisters: Diane (born 1945) and Barbara (born 1949).

In 1955, the Rovell family moved to a two-bedroom house at 616 North Sierra Bonita Avenue in Los Angeles. Her father took a job as a metal worker for the Lockheed Aircraft Corporation and, on the weekends, a part-time job as a clothing salesman. Beach Boys biographer Steven Gaines wrote that the family "were what the decidedly anti-Semitic Hawthorne crowd considered 'Fairfax Jews'".

The family soon purchased an upright piano for their living room. In Gaines' description, "Mae was the musical one in the family", and all of her daughters "had strong, harmonious voices and loved to sing". According to biographer James Murphy, "Their home was filled with music and the girls spent hours gathered around Mae’s piano singing their favorite songs by the Andrews Sisters and the McGuire Sisters."

Both Marilyn and Diane attended Fairfax High School.

== The Honeys ==
By 1958, Marilyn and her sisters had formed a music trio, known as "the Rovell Sisters". whose act featured renditions of songs such as the McGuire Sisters' "Ding Dong" and "Sugartime". The Rovell Sisters appeared on local television programs and competed in talent contests.

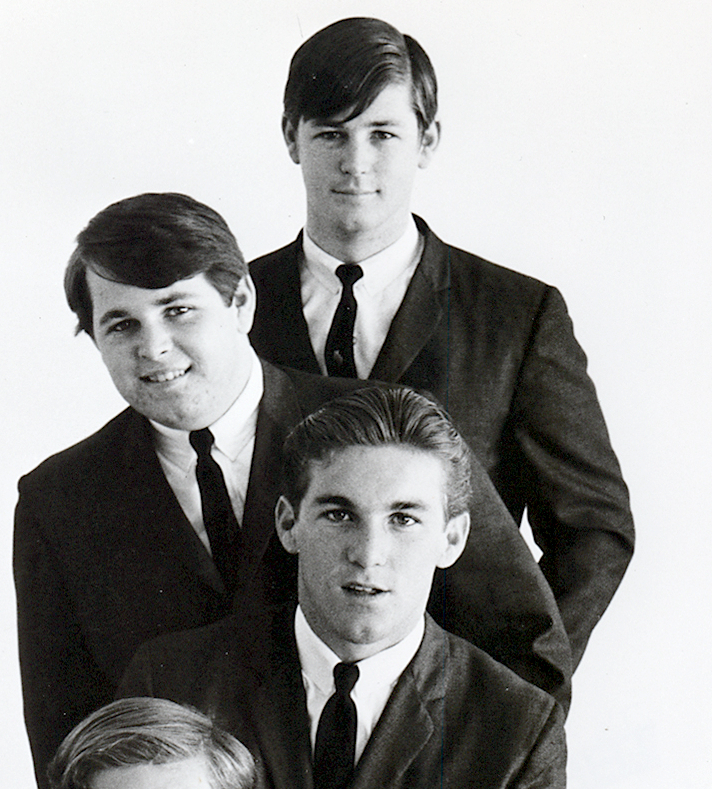
Brian Wilson (top) with his brothers Carl and Dennis (1963)

Marilyn met Brian Wilson when she attended a Beach Boys concert at Pandora's Box, a Sunset Strip nightclub, in August 1962 with Diane and their cousin Ginger Blake, who was dating Wilson's collaborator Gary Usher. According to Marilyn, "I was drinking hot chocolate. After they finished their song, Brian looked at me and said, ‘Can I have a sip?’ I said, ‘Sure’ and, as he gave it back to me, it spilled all over me and we started laughing. That's how we met." Later, Wilson's song "All Summer Long" nodded to their first meeting with the lyric "Remember when you spilled Coke all over your blouse?"

Brian prevailed upon Capitol Records to sign the Rovell sisters, whom he rechristened "the Honeys", envisioning them as a female counterpart to the Beach Boys. The company released several Honeys recordings as singles, although they sold poorly.

== Early relationship with Wilson ==
Marilyn began dating Brian Wilson when she was 15 and he was 21. They initially concealed their relationship, though her parents had no objections to it. (Note: Wilson biographer Peter Ames Carlin states the couple had dated "seemingly with the knowledge and permission" of her parents. Gaines writes, "Some visitors at the Rovells' remember May and Irving were extremely encouraging over Brian's relationship with their daughters and would have liked to have him as a son-in-law". Some sources allege that Brian's family and friends had been against the relationship due to the Rovells' Jewish heritage.) Brian had been closely acquainted with the Rovell family and, from 1963 to 1964, was allowed to make their home his primary residence. The couple shared a bedroom, but slept in different beds. Inspired by a remark from Diane, Brian wrote "Don't Hurt My Little Sister" about the Rovell sisters and his treatment of Marilyn, released as an album track on The Beach Boys Today! (1965).

In between her time spent recording and performing, Marilyn worked at a doughnut shop, and enrolled in Hollywood Professional School with Diane. Brian moved out of the Rovells' home in late 1964, after which Marilyn's relationship turned more serious. She recalled, "I had started falling in love with him. I knew he really liked me and I knew that he cared for me, but I didn't think he was in love with me." (Note: Gaines writes that it had been "often unclear to outsiders exactly which sister Brian loved best", with Marilyn and Diane later "caught up in a benign competition" that persisted even after Marilyn had married Brian. Carlin writes that Brian's "first crush was on Diane, the more moody and independent of the sisters, but Marilyn had an uncomplicated sweetness that also appealed to him".)

On November 1, 1964, Wilson and his bandmates embarked on their second overseas tour. He recalled that immediately before boarding his flight, he had suspected that Marilyn had been in love with Mike Love and "had a nervous breakdown over it." In Marilyn's version of the events that day, she had overheard Brian and his cousin discussing how they were "going to have a blast" together on various escapades throughout the tour. Marilyn then remarked, "I hope you guys enjoy yourselves, because I'm going to have a good time too." During the subsequent flight, Wilson had a panic attack and sent two telegrams to Marilyn proposing that they marry.

== Post-marriage ==
Brian and Marilyn were married on December 7, 1964. Within weeks, Wilson had a nervous breakdown that he attributed, in part, to himself and Marilyn not "getting along too good". Marilyn took her husband to see a psychiatrist, who declared that Brian's issues were due to work-related stress. Further conflicts in their marriage were exacerbated by his progressive drug habits, spurred on by a new friendship with talent agent Loren Schwartz. She reflected, "He was not the same Brian that he was before the drugs. [...] These people were very hurtful, and I tried to get that through to Brian." Following unsuccessful attempts to distance Wilson away from Schwartz, Marilyn separated from Brian for at least a month. Marilyn later reconciled with her husband and returned to live with him.

Much of the lyrical content from the Beach Boys' Pet Sounds reflected the couple's early marital struggles. Marilyn felt that her relationship with Brian was a central thematic reference, particularly for "You Still Believe in Me" and "Caroline, No". (Note: Other sources state that "Caroline, No" may have been written for Carol Mountain, Brian's acquaintance from high school.) "Wouldn't It Be Nice" was similarly inspired by Brian's feelings for Diane, Marilyn's sister. According to the album's lyricist, Tony Asher, Brian was visibly "confused about love", having displayed an infatuation with Diane for the duration of the album's writing sessions. (Note: Diane admitted having an affair with Brian which took place in the early 1970s. Asher was further bemused by what he described as "the weird relationship [Brian] maintained with Marilyn ... like something out of The Flintstones.") When Pet Sounds was assembled, Brian brought a complete acetate to Marilyn, who remembered, "It was so beautiful, one of the most spiritual times of my whole life. We both cried."

In early 1967, the couple put their Laurel Way house up for sale and took residence at a newly purchased Bel Air mansion on Bellagio Road. Marilyn told Gaines that they moved because her husband had "wanted a bigger home", but according to Badman, the move was to extricate themselves from Brian's "hanger-ons". (Note: In the 2021 documentary Long Promised Road, Brian stated that Marilyn had instigated the move.) She referred to Brian's friends as "drainers", a sentiment shared by the rest of Wilson's family, who had felt that some of Brian's associates had been enabling his drug habits and other self-destructive behavior. To keep away strangers, Marilyn installed a high brick wall and an electronically controlled gate around the estate.

Marilyn and Brian had two daughters, Carnie and Wendy (born 1968 and 1969, respectively), who later had musical success of their own as two-thirds of the group Wilson Phillips. Marilyn remembered "really getting worried about Brian" around this time, explaining that she felt there "was suddenly a difference between having fun and having sick fun ... once you have a child you look at things differently". Carnie remembered her mother explaining to her as a child that her father would "never be able to be a father like your friends have."

Marilyn later said of Brian, "I slept with one eye open because I never knew what he was going to do. He was like a wild man." A few years into their marriage, Marilyn was encouraged by her husband to have affairs with other men, including songwriter Tandyn Almer in the early 1970s. (Note: In turn, Wilson had a simultaneous affair with Diane. She eventually banished Diane from their Bellagio home in late 1973. Marilyn reflected, "I was his lover, she was a best friend. I mean, if I couldn't trust my own sister, who could I trust?") Frustrated with the constant visits to their home from musicians and producers, Marilyn had the band's studio, located within the Wilson household, dismantled in 1972. Due to Brian's continued drug expenditures, his income was also redirected to Marilyn's bank account.

== American Spring ==
In 1970, Marilyn and Diane formed the music duo American Spring, a collaboration with Brian and musician David Sandler. Released in July 1972, the group's only album Spring was critically acclaimed but failed to chart.

== Leading Wilson to professional care and separation ==
It was difficult to find somebody who could help [Brian] 'cause I didn't know what needed to be helped. Sometimes I really thought to myself, is it me? Am I the one who's not seein' things right? [...] because everyone loved Brian and just said, "Oh, he'll get over it."

— Marilyn, 1976

Responding to accusations of neglect, Marilyn stated that she had sought professional help for her husband for many years, but was unable "to find someone who could deal with him on his own level". (Note: Gaines had reported that "no professional help" was sought.) Wilson's mother Audree told a journalist, "It would get to the point where Marilyn really thought Brian needed help; then he seemed okay, and she'd sort of forget about it, not necessarily talking to him about it at all."

Early in 1975, Marilyn consulted Brian's cousin, Stephen Love, telling him that she was considering having Brian committed to a psychiatric hospital and divorce him if he continued to refuse counseling. Love countered that it was preferable to hire Stan, his younger brother, as Brian's caretaker. This arrangement with Stan persisted for several months, after which Marilyn successfully persuaded Brian to volunteer himself as a patient under psychologist Eugene Landy's 24-hour therapy regimen.

Under Landy's care, Brian became more stable and productive. In 1976, he recorded an original song called "Marilyn Rovell", a dedication to his wife, the track was finally released on We Gotta Groove: The Brother Studio Years. The 1977 album The Beach Boys Love You included "Let's Put Our Hearts Together", a duet between the couple. A photo of the couple was prominently displayed within the album's inner sleeve.

In December 1976, after Landy had raised his fee, Marilyn relieved him of his services and a new psychiatrist was immediately brought to Brian. When the psychiatrist died in an accident soon thereafter, Stan was reemployed as Brian's caretaker, now working alongside professional model Rocky Pamplin in keeping Brian stable and sober.

Three weeks after Pamplin had been hired as Wilson's bodyguard, Marilyn began having an affair with the model. Wilson and Marilyn separated in July 1978. According to Marilyn, she ended her relationship with Pamplin in January 1979, after Pamplin had declared he would be recording his own album with Wilson as producer. Wilson filed for divorce from Marilyn that same month.

== Later years ==
After her divorce from Wilson, Marilyn became a real estate broker and married a man named Daniel Rutherford. She was granted custody of their children and half of a share of Wilson's songwriting royalties. She and her children later moved to a home in Encino, California.

Marilyn and Wilson remained friends, although she and the children were not allowed to contact Wilson during the period in which he was readmitted into Landy's program in the 1980s. On February 6, 1995, the date of her 47th birthday, she attended her ex-husband's wedding to Melinda Ledbetter. Wilson purposely chose Marilyn's birthday for the wedding ceremony date so that it would be easy to remember for future anniversaries.

In 2022, Marilyn filed a $6.7 million suit against Wilson regarding "copyright termination interests" after Wilson had sold his publishing rights to Universal Music Publishing Group for $50 million.

== Fictional depictions ==
- In the 2014 biopic Love & Mercy, Marilyn is portrayed by Erin Darke.

== Bibliography ==
- Badman, Keith (2004). The Beach Boys: The Definitive Diary of America's Greatest Band, on Stage and in the Studio. Backbeat Books. ISBN 978-0-87930-818-6.
- Carlin, Peter Ames (2006). Catch a Wave: The Rise, Fall, and Redemption of the Beach Boys' Brian Wilson. Rodale. ISBN 978-1-59486-320-2.
- Dillon, Mark (2012). Fifty Sides of the Beach Boys: The Songs That Tell Their Story. ECW Press. ISBN 978-1-77090-198-8.
- Gaines, Steven (1986). Heroes and Villains: The True Story of The Beach Boys. New York: Da Capo Press. ISBN 0306806479.
- Granata, Charles L. (2003). Wouldn't It Be Nice: Brian Wilson and the Making of the Beach Boys' Pet Sounds. A Cappella Books. ISBN 9781556525070.
- Kent, Nick (1995). "The Last Beach Movie Revisited: The Life of Brian Wilson". The Dark Stuff: Selected Writings on Rock Music. Da Capo Press. ISBN 0306806460.
- Leaf, David (1978). The Beach Boys and the California Myth. New York: Grosset & Dunlap. ISBN 978-0-448-14626-3.
- Love, Mike (2016). Good Vibrations: My Life as a Beach Boy. Penguin Publishing Group. ISBN 978-0-698-40886-9.
- Murphy, James B. (2015). Becoming the Beach Boys, 1961-1963. McFarland. ISBN 978-0-7864-7365-6.
- White, Timothy (1996). The Nearest Faraway Place: Brian Wilson, the Beach Boys, and the Southern Californian Experience. Macmillan. ISBN 0333649370.
- Wilson, Brian; Gold, Todd (1991). Wouldn't It Be Nice: My Own Story. New York: HarperCollins. ISBN 978-0-06018-313-4.
- Wilson, Brian; Greenman, Ben (2016). I Am Brian Wilson: A Memoir. Da Capo Press. ISBN 978-0-306-82307-7.
