= Good to My Baby =

Song by The Beach Boys

from the album The Beach Boys Today!
- Released: March 8, 1965
- Recorded: track: January 13, 1965 vocals:January 19, 1965
- Genre: Rock
- Length: 2:16
- Label: Capitol
- Composer(s): Brian Wilson
- Lyricist(s): Mike Love
- Producer(s): Brian Wilson

Audio sample
- "Good to My Baby": file; help

"Good to My Baby" is a song composed by Brian Wilson with words by Mike Love for the American rock band The Beach Boys.

== Composition ==
Author Philip Lambert wrote that the song "has all the earmarks of a classic feel-good Beach Boys song: powerful, catchy vocals, including back-and-forth leads between Brian and Mike [Love], a clean, tight instrumental track, and a straightforward message about the rewards and benefits of monogamy." Scott Interrante of PopMatters claimed that the song was "a solidly written song reminiscent of the group's earlier singles: sophisticated but digestible and fun" and went on to claim that "when it’s juxtaposed against songs like 'When I Grow Up (To Be a Man)' and 'Please Let Me Wonder', it shows us just how impressive those other songs really are."

== Other appearances ==
Aside from its appearance on Today!, "Good to My Baby" has since been released on numerous compilation albums. The song appeared on the British release of Best of The Beach Boys Vol. 2, as well as 1975's Spirit of America, the follow-up to the band's hugely successful 1974 compilation album, Endless Summer. More recently, the song has appeared on albums such as the box set The Capitol Years, the compilation album Summer Love Songs, and the rarities collection Hawthorne, CA.

== Personnel ==
As documented by Craig Slowinski.

The Beach Boys

- Al Jardine – backing vocals
- Mike Love – lead & backing vocals
- Brian Wilson – grand piano, lead & backing vocals
- Carl Wilson – lead and rhythm guitar, backing vocals
- Dennis Wilson – backing vocals

Additional musicians and production staff

- Hal Blaine – drums
- Steve Douglas – tenor saxophone
- Plas Johnson – tenor saxophone
- Carol Kaye – bass guitar
- Jay Migliori – baritone saxophone
- Bill Pitman – electric and acoustic rhythm guitar
- Don Randi – tack piano, Hammond B-3 organ
- Billy Strange – lead guitar
- Ron Swallow – tambourine
- Tommy Tedesco – rhythm guitar, autoharp
- Julius Wechter – conga drums
