= Please Let Me Wonder =

- U.S. picture sleeve (reverse)

Single by the Beach Boys

from the album The Beach Boys Today!
- A-side: "Do You Wanna Dance?"
- Released: February 15, 1965
- Recorded: January 7–9, 1965
- Studio: Western, Hollywood
- Genre: Pop
- Length: 2:45
- Label: Capitol
- Songwriters: Brian Wilson, Mike Love
- Producer: Brian Wilson

The Beach Boys singles chronology
| "The Man with All the Toys" (1964) | "Do You Wanna Dance?" / "Please Let Me Wonder" (1965) | "Help Me, Rhonda" (1965) |

"Please Let Me Wonder" is a song by the American rock band the Beach Boys from their 1965 album The Beach Boys Today!. Written by Brian Wilson and Mike Love, it was the first song Wilson wrote under the influence of marijuana. On February 15, the song was issued as the B-side to their "Do You Wanna Dance?" single before the album's release.

== Background and arrangement ==
"Please Let Me Wonder" was the first song Wilson wrote under the influence of marijuana. Wilson said that he produced the song "as a tribute to Phil Spector", although the arrangement, which highlights different, individual instruments throughout the song, was in direct contrast to the methods employed by Spector for his Wall of Sound.

AllMusic reviewer Matthew Greenwald wrote of the song:

Built around a lilting, gracious melody that vaguely recalls some of Wilson's doo wop influences, it's also somewhat akin to some of the contemporary (and mostly upcoming) ballad statements that folk-rock would embrace. ...Through the years, it has become known as one of the most treasured of Brian Wilson's more obscure album cuts. A quantum leap for this gifted composer.

The instrumentation includes drums, timpani, tambourine, bass, two guitars, acoustic guitar, piano, tack piano, organ, horns, and vibraphone. In journalist David Howard's description, the song "specifically demonstrates" Wilson's "newfound insight" of "deconstruct[ing] songs into tiny increments and deal with each instrument individually, stacking sounds one at a time." Contributing to this effect, academic Jody O'Regan writes that the arrangement has "Some little accents, like the use of vibraphone, [that] only happen three times, and not always in a repetitive fashion. Similarly, a second electric guitar pops in and out during chorus sections to thicken the texture of the song, while horn parts surface in verse two, to delineate the sound of each song section."

== Lyrics ==
The song is about a man who is afraid that a girl will reveal that she does not love him, and so he instead prefers to fantasize that she does. Greenwald said that "the lyrics are filled with a sense of longing and uncertainty, sort of a flip side to Wilson's 'When I Grow Up to Be a Man.'" Journalist Scott Interrante's reading of the lyrics is that Wilson uses "a virginity metaphor to discuss his fears of commitment and intimacy in his own marriage."

== Recording ==
The backing track was recorded on January 7, 1965, at Western Studio. Wilson later remembered of the song, "I wrote that at my apartment in West Hollywood. As soon as I finished I felt I had to record it so I called up my engineer, Chuck Britz, and woke him up. 'Please Let Me Wonder' was recorded at 3:30 in the morning. I drove to the studio in the middle of the night and recorded it." The session logs indicate that the instrumental track was actually recorded between 7:00 p.m. and 10:30 p.m. Vocals were overdubbed on January 9.

The song ends with Brian Wilson saying in a spoken-word delivery, "I love you". According to him, this was an improvised line during recording.

== Release ==
On February 15, 1965, "Please Let Me Wonder" was issued as the B-side of "Do You Wanna Dance?", the third single from The Beach Boys Today!. On February 28, the band (with Brian) appeared on Shindig! for a performance that included a truncated version of "Please Let Me Wonder".

Billboard described the song as an "interesting and well done change of pace ballad." Cash Box described it as "an easy-going, slowrockin’ ode about the ambiguities of a love relationship." Record World said "The harmony is pure and the tune is slow. Will lull many a teen into a romantic mood."

== Personnel ==
Per Craig Slowinski.

The Beach Boys

- Al Jardine – harmony and backing vocals
- Brian Wilson – lead, harmony and backing vocals, upright piano, Farfisa organ
- Carl Wilson – harmony and backing vocals, 12-string lead guitar
- Dennis Wilson – harmony and backing vocals, percussion, tambourine, tom-tom
- Mike Love – harmony and backing vocals

Additional musicians and production staff

- Glen Campbell – 12-string acoustic guitar
- Steve Douglas – tenor saxophone
- Plas Johnson – tenor saxophone
- Carol Kaye – bass guitar
- Barney Kessel – classical guitar
- Jack Nimitz – baritone saxophone
- Earl Palmer – drums, timbales
- Don Randi – grand piano, Hammond B-3 organ
- Billy Lee Riley – double-reed harmonica
- Billy Strange – acoustic guitar
- Jerry Williams – vibraphone, timpani
- Ron Swallow – tambourine, woodblock

== Cover versions ==
- 1984 – Tatsuro Yamashita, Big Wave
- 1992 - Mi-Ke (Japanese language version), Taiyou no Shimo no Surfing JAPAN (太陽の下のサーフィン JAPAN)
- 1997 – The King's Singers, Spirit Voices
- 2021 - John Greene, Hawaiiana
