= She Knows Me Too Well =

- U.S. picture sleeve

Single by the Beach Boys

from the album The Beach Boys Today!
- A-side: "When I Grow Up (To Be a Man)"
- Released: August 24, 1964
- Recorded: August 5–8, 1964
- Studio: Western, Hollywood
- Genre: Pop rock; doo-wop; surf
- Length: 2:27
- Label: Capitol
- Composer(s): Brian Wilson
- Lyricist(s): Brian Wilson; Mike Love
- Producer(s): Brian Wilson

The Beach Boys singles chronology
"I Get Around" (1964)	"When I Grow Up (To Be a Man)" / "She Knows Me Too Well" (1964)	"Dance, Dance, Dance" (1964)

Licensed audio
- "She Knows Me Too Well" on YouTube

"She Knows Me Too Well" is a song written by Brian Wilson and Mike Love for the American rock band the Beach Boys, about a man who is engrossed and obsessed in his own jealousy and insecurity. It was released on the 1965 album The Beach Boys Today!, initially serving as the B-side of their "When I Grow Up (To Be a Man)" single in 1964. It was among the earliest songs Brian composed while influenced by marijuana.

== Composition ==
Brian considered the song a tribute to Burt Bacharach. According to Allmusic, "This song can essentially be called 'son of "Don't Worry Baby".' It's built around the same kinds of Spector-inspired chord changes and also has a similar sense of vulnerability." According to PopMatters,

The harmonically complex song perfectly expresses the tension and confusion of the lyrics, but always manages to be accessible and tuneful in a way that only Brian Wilson can pull off. That the track was first recorded so early in the album process (before the process even began, in fact) and manages to be one of the most forward-thinking tracks the Beach Boys had put out up to this point, is quite astonishing.

Interpreting its lyrics,

the narrator explores his own relational shortcomings but continues to delude himself into thinking that everything is alright. The first verse expresses his guilt, admitting “I treat her so mean, I don’t deserve what I have / And I think that she’ll forget just by making her laugh”. The second verse, half of which is repeated after the bridge, discusses his jealousy and insecurity, hinting at his emotional abuse of her. He sings, “I get so jealous of the other guy / And then I’m not happy till I make her break down and cry”. But he also recognizes his hypocrisy: “When I look at other girls, it must kill her inside”. But all these issues, in his mind at least, are taken care of by the fact that “she can tell I really love her”. The choruses express the sentiment that because she knows him so well, none of these things matter. They do, of course, but his delusion makes for a more interesting song.

David Leaf believed the song "is another of the important musical developments on the road to Pet Sounds, and in retrospect, hearing this in 1965 might have felt very strange … almost like you were hearing a cut from Pet Sounds a year before that album even existed." He also notes that it was "a gorgeous production, but it took a little while to get used to, probably because the bittersweet chord changes and harmonies were more sophisticated than the typical pop ballad of the day."

== Recording ==
The song was recorded over two sessions at United Western Recorders in early August, both engineered by Chuck Britz and produced by Brian Wilson: the first session for the instrumental track took place on August 5 in tandem with "When I Grow Up (To Be a Man)"; three days later, the vocals were recorded. They are doubletracked, just as they are on most Beach Boys songs. The instrumental track features Carl Wilson on both lead and rhythm electric guitars, Alan Jardine on electric bass guitar, Brian Wilson on acoustic upright piano, and Dennis Wilson on drums. The song features Brian Wilson on lead vocal and Brian, Carl & Dennis Wilson, Mike Love, and Al Jardine on backing vocals.

On the Unsurpassed Masters Vol. 7 (1964): The Alternate "Beach Boys Today" Album Vol. 1 bootleg, various recording sessions were released in high quality. Four takes of the instrumental track (plus rehearsals) were released on this bootleg, as well as two backing vocal overdubs and Brian's lead vocal overdub.

== Release ==
In August 1964, "She Knows Me Too Well" was released in the United States as the B-side of the "When I Grow Up (To Be a Man)" single. The single, the band's tenth in the United States, peaked at number nine position on the Billboard charts, with "She Knows Me Too Well" in its own right placing at number 101 in Billboard and number 93 in Cash Box. The song was treated as the A-side at Vancouver's popular CFUN station and reached number seven locally.

The song was also released in the United Kingdom, again as the B-side of the "When I Grow Up (To Be a Man)" single, which was the band's sixth there. The single didn't fare as well, but still peaked at number 27 on the charts.

Cash Box described it as "a captivating cha cha beat romancer that's...sure to please the kids."

American rock band Stone Temple Pilots recorded a cover version of the song during the sessions for their 1994 album Purple. This version of the song was included on the band's 2019 "Super Deluxe" version of the album.

== Personnel ==
Track details courtesy of session archivist Craig Slowinski.

The Beach Boys

- Al Jardine – electric bass guitar, harmony and background vocals
- Mike Love – harmony and background vocals
- Brian Wilson – lead, harmony and background vocals; acoustic upright piano
- Carl Wilson – harmony and background vocals; electric lead and rhythm guitars
- Dennis Wilson – harmony and background vocals; drums

Additional personnel

- Chuck Britz – sound engineer
- Russ Titelman – microphone boom with screwdriver
