= Blue Christmas (song) =

1948 Christmas song written by Billy Hayes and J W. Johnson

Single by Elvis Presley

from the album Elvis' Christmas Album
- B-side: "Wooden Heart" (447–0720); "Santa Claus Is Back in Town" (447–0647)
- Written: 1948
- Released: October 15, 1957 (as an album track); November 3, 1964 (as a single)
- Recorded: September 5, 1957
- Studio: Radio Recorders, Hollywood
- Genre: Christmas; R&B; rock and roll; country
- Length: 2:07
- Label: RCA Victor 447-0720, RCA Victor 447-0647
- Songwriters: Billy Hayes; Jay W. Johnson

Elvis Presley singles chronology
"Ain't That Loving You Baby" / "Ask Me" (1964)	"Blue Christmas" (1957)	"Do the Clam" / "You'll Be Gone" (1965)

Official audio
- "Blue Christmas" on YouTube

"Blue Christmas" is a Christmas song written by Billy Hayes and Jay W. Johnson and most famously recorded by Elvis Presley, although it was first recorded by Doye O'Dell in 1948. It is a tale of unrequited love during the holidays and is a longstanding staple of Christmas music.

== History ==
=== Initial recordings and major versions ===
The song was originally recorded by American country singer, musician and actor Doye O'Dell in 1948 and was popularized the following year in three separate recordings: one by country artist Ernest Tubb, one by musical conductor and arranger Hugo Winterhalter and his orchestra and chorus, and one by bandleader Russ Morgan and his orchestra (the latter featuring lead vocals by Morgan and backing vocals by singers credited as the Morganaires). Tubb's version spent the first week of January 1950 at No. 1 on Billboard magazine's Most-Played Juke Box (Country & Western) Records chart, while Winterhalter's version peaked at No. 9 on Billboard's Records Most Played by Disk Jockeys chart, and Morgan's version reached No. 11 on Billboard's Best-Selling Pop Singles chart. Both Morgan's and Winterhalter's versions featured a shorter pop edit of the original lyrics. Also in 1950, crooner Billy Eckstine recorded his rendition, backed by the orchestra of Russ Case, with these shortened lyrics in a variation close to what is now the common standard for this song; the orchestral backing of this recording has often been wrongly accredited to Winterhalter.

Elvis Presley cemented the status of "Blue Christmas" as a rock-and-roll holiday classic by recording it for his 1957 LP Elvis' Christmas Album. Presley's version is notable musicologically as well as culturally in that the backing vocal group, the Jordanaires (especially in the soprano line, sung by Millie Kirkham), replace many major and just minor thirds with neutral and septimal minor thirds, respectively. In addition to contributing to the overall tone of the song, the resulting "blue notes" constitute a musical play on words that provides an "inside joke" or "Easter egg" to trained ears. "Blue Christmas" was also included on a 1957 45 EP (Extended Play) entitled Elvis Sings Christmas Songs (EPA-4108), which also included "Santa Bring My Baby Back (To Me)" on side one, with "Santa Claus Is Back in Town" and "I'll Be Home for Christmas" on side two. Presley's original 1957 version was released as a commercially available single for the first time in 1964. This single was also a hit in the United Kingdom, reaching No. 11 on the British singles chart during the week of December 26, 1964.

In December 2023, the British Phonographic Industry certified the single with a platinum award, reflecting sales and streams in the UK in excess of 600,000 units since its release in 2004. On Billboard magazine's January 5, 2019, edition, the song reached the number 40 position on the Billboard Hot 100, the latter for the first time since its release in 1964.

== Personnel ==
=== Original 1957 version ===
Sourced from Keith Flynn.

- Elvis Presley – lead vocals, acoustic rhythm guitar
- Scotty Moore – lead guitar
- Bill Black – bass
- D. J. Fontana – drums
- Dudley Brooks – piano
- The Jordanaires – backing vocals
- Millie Kirkham – backing vocals

=== 1968 live version ===
Sourced from Keith Flynn.

- Elvis Presley – lead vocals, electric rhythm/lead guitar
- Scotty Moore – acoustic rhythm guitar
- Charlie Hodge – backing vocals, acoustic rhythm guitar
- D. J. Fontana – percussion
- Alan Fortas – percussion
- Lance LeGault – tambourine, possible backing vocals

== Beach Boys version ==
"Blue Christmas"

Single by The Beach Boys

from the album The Beach Boys' Christmas Album
- A-side: "The Man with All the Toys"
- Released: November 9, 1964
- Recorded: June 24–28, 1964
- Genre: Christmas; pop; rock
- Length: 4:41 (for both songs)
- Label: Capitol
- Songwriters: Billy Hayes; Jay W. Johnson
- Producer: Brian Wilson

The Beach Boys singles chronology
"Dance, Dance, Dance" (1964)	"Blue Christmas" (1964)	"Do You Wanna Dance?" (1965)

The rock band The Beach Boys recorded a version featuring Brian Wilson on lead vocals, releasing it in the United States on November 16, 1964, in two separate formats simultaneously: as the B-side of "The Man with All the Toys" single and as a track on The Beach Boys' Christmas Album. The song also appears in the 1974 Rankin/Bass animated special, The Year Without a Santa Claus. In the cartoon, Santa is considering skipping Christmas one year, thinking no one believes in him, and there is very little good will on the planet. Children around the world respond by sending Santa presents, and one little girl sends him a letter, telling Santa it will be a "blue Christmas" without him, while the song plays, and is sung by a little girl.

== Shakin' Stevens version ==
Shakin' Stevens recorded a version which was released as the lead track on The Shakin' Stevens EP, which reached No. 2 in the UK singles chart in December 1982.

== Other charting versions ==
- 1960: The Browns' version peaked at No. 97 on the Billboard Hot 100 singles chart in December 1960.
- 2022: Kane Brown's version peaked at No. 73 on the Billboard Hot 100 in January 2023.

== Charts ==
Chart performance for the Elvis Presley rendition of "Blue Christmas"
Chart (1964–2025)	Peak position
Australia (ARIA)	42
Austria (Ö3 Austria Top 40)	70
Canada Hot 100 (Billboard)	14
France (SNEP)	154
Germany (GfK)	92
Global 200 (Billboard)	26
Greece International (IFPI)	36
Hungary (Stream Top 40)	24
Ireland (IRMA)	38
Italy (FIMI)	76
Latvia (DigiTop100)	20
Lithuania (AGATA)	51
Netherlands (Single Top 100)	29
New Zealand (Lever Hit Parade)	5
New Zealand (Recorded Music NZ)	38
Norway (VG-lista)	38
Portugal (AFP)	47
Spain (Promusicae)	86
Sweden (Sverigetopplistan)	25
Switzerland (Schweizer Hitparade)	41
UK Singles (Official Charts)	11
US Christmas Singles (Billboard)	1
US Billboard Hot 100	18
US Hot Country Songs (Billboard)	55
US Holiday 100 (Billboard)	12
US Rolling Stone Top 100	14

Chart performance for the Michael Bublé rendition of "Blue Christmas"
Chart (2012–2014)	Peak position
Hungary (Single Top 40)	4
Hungary (Stream Top 40)	39

== Certifications ==
Certifications for the Elvis Presley rendition of "Blue Christmas"
Region	Certification	Certified units/sales
Australia (ARIA)	Gold	35,000^{‡}
Denmark (IFPI Danmark)	Gold	45,000^{‡}
Italy (FIMI)	Gold	50,000^{‡}
New Zealand (RMNZ)	Platinum	30,000^{‡}
Portugal (AFP)	Gold	12,000^{‡}
United Kingdom (BPI) Sales since 2004	Platinum	600,000^{‡}
United States (RIAA)	Platinum	1,000,000^{^}
Streaming
Greece (IFPI Greece)	Gold	1,000,000^{†}
^{^} Shipments figures based on certification alone.^{‡} Sales+streaming figures based on certification alone.^{†} Streaming-only figures based on certification alone.
