= Kiss Me, Baby =

1965 single by The Beach Boys

- U.S. picture sleeve (reverse)

Single by the Beach Boys

from the album The Beach Boys Today!
- A-side: "Help Me, Rhonda"
- Released: April 5, 1965
- Recorded: December 16, 1964 – January 15, 1965
- Studio: Western, Hollywood
- Genre: Rock; pop
- Length: 2:35
- Label: Capitol
- Composer(s): Brian Wilson
- Lyricist(s): Brian Wilson; Mike Love
- Producer(s): Brian Wilson

The Beach Boys singles chronology
"Do You Wanna Dance?" (1965)	"Help Me, Rhonda" / "Kiss Me, Baby" (1965)	"California Girls" (1965)

Licensed audio
- "Kiss Me, Baby" on YouTube

"Kiss Me, Baby" is a song by the American rock band the Beach Boys from their 1965 album The Beach Boys Today!. Written by Brian Wilson and Mike Love, it was issued as the B-side of the group's single, "Help Me, Rhonda," on April 5, 1965.

== Overview ==
"Kiss Me, Baby" is about a quarrel between the narrator and his lover, and his attempt to repair their relationship. Wilson was inspired to write "Kiss Me, Baby" while walking around a red light district in Copenhagen. He composed it at his hotel room there on November 14, 1964, days after proposing to singer Marilyn Rovell. Love said that the "wistful bass line ... led to my lyrics about a guy who has a disagreement with his girlfriend, even though they can't even remember what they fought about, leaving them both brokenhearted."

The arrangement features basses, guitars, saxophone, pianos, vibraphone, drums, and temple blocks—the sound of the latter percussion soon became a signature for Wilson– as well as English horn and French horn. Doo-wop style background vocals sing "Kiss a little bit, fight a little bit" repetitively throughout the chorus and outro. Love described the "R&B, doo-wop, bass thing" as an "'In the Still of the Night' type vibe". Journalist Scott Interrante interpreted this part of the lyric as implying that the narrator "knows the on-again/off-again relationship should remain off. But this doesn’t stop him from wondering, as he lies awake at sunrise, 'Are you still awake like me?'"

Biographer Mark Dillon cited it as "a ballad that pleaded for the romantic reconciliation [Wilson] anticipated with Marilyn." Conversely, Interrante said that it "doesn’t seem to lyrically parallel Brian Wilson’s personal life at the time ... For an album whose songs are so concerned with the future—whether worrying about it or anticipating it—'Kiss Me, Baby' is an odd man out, focusing on coming to terms with the present."

== Recording ==
The song was recorded over two dates at Western Recorders, both produced by Brian Wilson. The instrumental track was recorded on December 16, 1964, with Chuck Britz engineering. The vocals were overdubbed on January 15, 1965. It has the distinction of being the only track on Today! whose recording spanned before and after Wilson's nervous breakdown in late December 1964.

== Critical reception ==
Thomas Ward of AllMusic praised "Kiss Me, Baby" as a product of Wilson's "dense, multi-layered confessional songs, with adult themes and exploring issues previously only developed by performers such as Bob Dylan". Interrante described it as among Wilson's "most interesting compositions" in addition to containing "some of the thickest and most beautiful harmonies the group had pulled off up to that point." Biographer Jon Stebbins praised "Kiss Me, Baby" as "the pinnacle of balladry", one of the group's "most romantic and emotional songs", and "a mammoth artistic achievement". Billboard described "Kiss Me, Baby" as "good ballad material with strong arrangement and vocal performances." Cash Box described it as "a tender, slow-moving moody ballad which effectively blends in snatches of harmony and counterpoint."

== Variations ==
- A stereo remix of the song was released on the 1998 Endless Harmony Soundtrack.
- A Dolby Digital 5.1 surround sound version of the song was released on the Endless Harmony DVD as a bonus track. The track, along with the other 5.1 surround sound mixes, were produced and mixed by Mark Linett.
- An a cappella mix of the song was released on the 2001 archival release Hawthorne, CA.
- A performance of "Kiss Me, Baby" was included on Wilson's 2000 live album Live at the Roxy Theatre, where he introduced it as "kind of a sweet little song".

== Personnel ==
Per band archivist Craig Slowinski.

The Beach Boys

- Al Jardine – harmony and backing vocals
- Mike Love – lead, harmony and backing vocals
- Brian Wilson – lead and backing vocals, upright piano
- Carl Wilson – harmony and backing vocals; 12-string lead guitar
- Dennis Wilson – harmony and backing vocals

Additional musicians and production staff

- Hal Blaine – drums, temple block
- Peter Christ – English horn
- Steve Douglas – tenor saxophone
- Jay Migliori – baritone saxophone
- David Duke – French horn
- Carol Kaye – bass guitar
- Barney Kessel – 12-string acoustic guitar
- Bill Pitman – acoustic guitar
- Ray Pohlman – 6-string bass guitar
- Leon Russell – grand piano
- Billy Strange – electric guitar
- Julius Wechter – vibraphone, bell-tree
