= Don't Hurt My Little Sister =

Song by the Beach Boys

from the album The Beach Boys Today!
- Released: March 8, 1965
- Recorded: June 22, 1964
- Studio: Western, Hollywood
- Genre: Pop
- Length: 2:07
- Label: Capitol
- Composer: Brian Wilson
- Lyricists: Brian Wilson, Mike Love
- Producer: Brian Wilson

Audio sample
- file; help

"Don't Hurt My Little Sister" is a song by the American rock band the Beach Boys from their 1965 album The Beach Boys Today!. Written by Brian Wilson with additional lyrics by Mike Love, Wilson attributed the song's inspiration to Honeys singers Marilyn and Diane Rovell and their sister Barbara. It was produced on June 22, 1964, making it the earliest-recorded song on the album.

Cover versions of the song have been recorded by the Surfaris (in 1965) and Shonen Knife (in 1996). Wilson originally wrote the song for the Ronettes and submitted it to their producer, Phil Spector, for his approval. Spector accepted on the condition that the song be rewritten with different lyrics as "Things Are Changing (For the Better), a version recorded by the Blossoms.

== Composition and lyrics ==
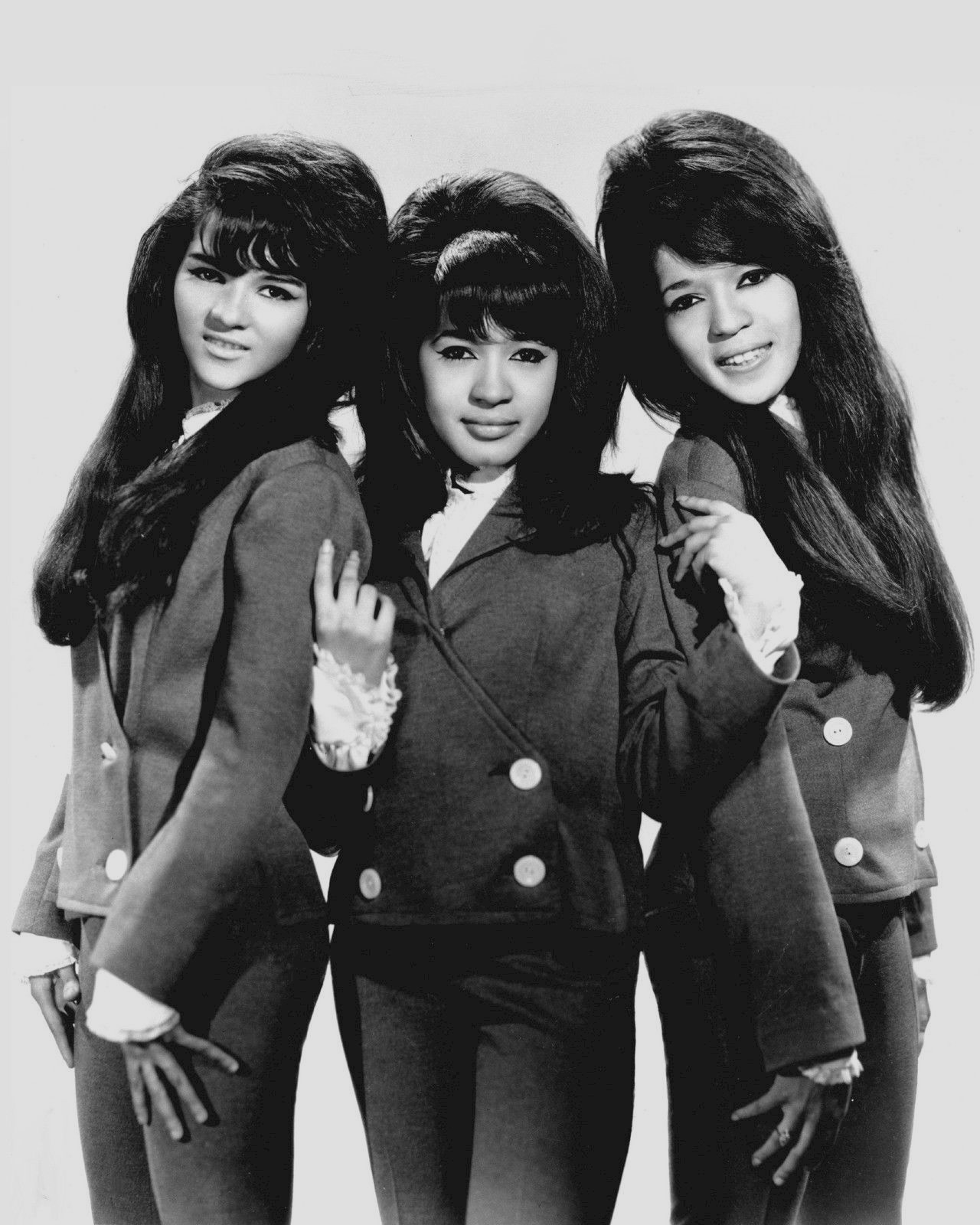
"Don't Hurt My Little Sister" was written for the Ronettes, Phil Spector's girl group

Wilson originally wrote "Don't Hurt My Little Sister" for the Ronettes, modelling the chords and melodies after the hits of their producer Phil Spector. Journalist Scott Interrante wrote, "while it may not be the most original composition on Today!, it's not without its interesting moments or sophisticated craft. Following the structure set up in Spector’s 'Be My Baby', the verses of 'Don’t Hurt My Little Sister' are simple and straightforward, while the pre-choruses are harmonically adventurous. But the chorus here, too, moves far away from the home key of B-flat in a sequence of chords led by a call-and-response vocal chanting."

According to Wilson's 2016 memoir, the song was written about his then-girlfriend Marilyn and her sisters Diane and Barbara Rovell: "I wrote it from the perspective of one of them telling me not to treat another one of them badly." (Note: Commentators often attribute the inspiration for the song to his conflicted infatuation for the girls, who were aged 16, 17, and 13, respectively, while he was 22. Biographer Peter Ames Carlin wrote that the subject matter "recounts Diane Rovell's pointed advice from the early (and surreptitious) days of Brian and Marilyn's affair, only with an uncomfortable fraternal ardor: 'Why don’t you love her like her big brother?'" Music journalist Alice Bolin referred to it as one of the "creepier" songs on Today!, albeit "probably composed with innocent intentions".) Asked if the song was "written about anyone in particular" in a 2022 interview, Mike Love responded:

Not that I remember. The Wilson brothers didn't have a sister, so that idea had to come from somebody else … I had three. It was made up but based on the protective feeling that a brother would have. It was a fun song, a neat song. It wasn't a hit song, but it certainly was a great album tune.

Wilson later recycled the chord progression of the song's refrain for the band's "California Girls" (1965).

== "Things are Changing (For the Better)" ==
Wilson submitted the song to Phil Spector for his approval. He had previously declined Wilson's "Don't Worry Baby", but agreed to record "Don't Hurt My Little Sister". According to biographer David Leaf,

After submitting the song to Phil Spector, Brian waited for a response. When Spector invited Brian to his hotel room for a talk, Brian found out that things had gone awry. There was a piano in the room, and Spector played Brian “Don’t Hurt My Little Sister” which Spector had unilaterally revamped into "Things Are Changing (For The Better)." ... That's as close as Brian and Phil ever came to working together.

Wilson was invited to perform piano on the song's recording, but was thrown out of the session by Spector due to "substandard playing". Spector finished a backing track, but scrapped the song. This backing track was later revived and given to the Blossoms. This new version, featuring Darlene Love on vocals, was a public service announcement for "equal-opportunity employment", a campaign by President Lyndon B. Johnson to "correct the inequality in employment opportunities between whites and minorities including blacks in the U.S.” The backing track was reused for versions by the Supremes and Jay and the Americans.

== Recording ==
"Don't Hurt My Little Sister" was recorded during the sessions for The Beach Boys' Christmas Album on June 22, 1964 at Western Studio.

== Personnel ==
Adapted from Craig Slowinski.

The Beach Boys

- Al Jardine – backing vocals, electric bass guitar
- Mike Love – lead and backing vocals
- Brian Wilson – lead and backing vocals, upright piano, producer
- Carl Wilson – backing vocals, 12-string lead/rhythm guitar
- Dennis Wilson – backing vocals, tambourine

Additional musicians and production staff

- Hal Blaine – drums
- Chuck Britz – engineer
- John Gray – grand piano
- Ray Pohlman – baritone rhythm guitar
- Tommy Tedesco – rhythm guitar

== Cover versions ==
As "Don't Hurt My Little Sister"

- 1965 – The Surfaris
- 1996 – Shonen Knife, The Birds & the B-Sides

As "Things Are Changing (For the Better)"

- 1965 – The Blossoms (as "Things Are Changing (For the Better)")
- 1965 – The Supremes (as "Things Are Changing")
- 1965 – Jay and the Americans (as "Things Are Changing")
