= The Beach Boys Today! =

1965 album by the Beach Boys

Studio album by the Beach Boys
- Released: March 8, 1965
- Recorded: June 22, 1964 – January 19, 1965
- Studios: Western; Gold Star; RCA Victor (Hollywood)
- Genres: Chamber pop; orchestral rock
- Length: 28:54
- Label: Capitol
- Producer: Brian Wilson

The Beach Boys chronology
The Beach Boys' Christmas Album (1964)	The Beach Boys Today! (1965)	Summer Days (And Summer Nights!!) (1965)

The Beach Boys UK chronology
Beach Boys' Party! (1966)	The Beach Boys Today! (1966)	Pet Sounds (1966)

Singles from The Beach Boys Today!
- 1. "When I Grow Up (To Be a Man)" / "She Knows Me Too Well" Released: August 24, 1964; 2. "Dance, Dance, Dance" Released: October 26, 1964; 3. "Do You Wanna Dance?" / "Please Let Me Wonder" Released: February 15, 1965

The Beach Boys Today! is the eighth studio album by the American rock band the Beach Boys, released March 8, 1965, by Capitol Records. Expanding on the increased musical sophistication that had marked their 1964 release All Summer Long, Today! signaled a departure from their previous work with its orchestral sound, intimate subject matter, and abandonment of car or surf songs. Side one features an uptempo sound, while side two consists mostly of introspective ballads. It has since become regarded as one of the greatest albums of all time.

The album was produced, arranged, and primarily written by Brian Wilson, with additional lyrics by Mike Love. Most of the material was recorded in January 1965 using over 25 studio musicians, following Wilson's withdrawal from touring due to a nervous breakdown. Unlike prior albums, none of the songs relied solely on traditional rock instrumentation; the arrangements incorporated timpani, harpsichord, vibraphone, French horn, and other orchestral elements, coupled with slower tempos, longer song structures, and influences drawn from Phil Spector and Burt Bacharach. Wilson also developed a more personalized, semi-autobiographical lyrical approach with recurring themes of emotional insecurity and self-doubt. The LP included "She Knows Me Too Well", depicting a man aware of his emotional cruelty; "Don't Hurt My Little Sister", in which a brother's protective stance is entangled with romantic overtones; and "In the Back of My Mind", a ballad concluding with an asynchronous instrumental collapse.

Today! reached number four in the U.S. during a 50-week chart stay and yielded three top 20 singles: "When I Grow Up (To Be a Man)" (number 9), "Dance, Dance, Dance" (number 8), and "Do You Wanna Dance?" (number 12). A rerecorded version of "Help Me, Rhonda", released in April, became the band's second U.S. number-one hit. Issued in the UK in April 1966, the album peaked at number six. The sessions also yielded the outtake "Guess I'm Dumb", a song Wilson ultimately produced for Glen Campbell. Today! contributed to the group's recognition as album artists and later the emergence of chamber/baroque pop, while retrospective commentary frequently highlights the latter half of the record as a precursor to Pet Sounds (1966).

== Background ==
Following the success of their chart-topping single "I Get Around", the Beach Boys undertook an intensified touring schedule. From June to August, they toured in support of their newest LP, All Summer Long, which featured their most complex arrangements to date and was their first album not centered on themes of cars or surfing. They also readied a Christmas album for release in November. By year's end, they had released four albums in 12 months and recorded the Today! singles "When I Grow Up (To Be a Man)" and "Dance, Dance, Dance". In November, they toured the UK and mainland Europe for the first time, appearing on television programs and performing live.

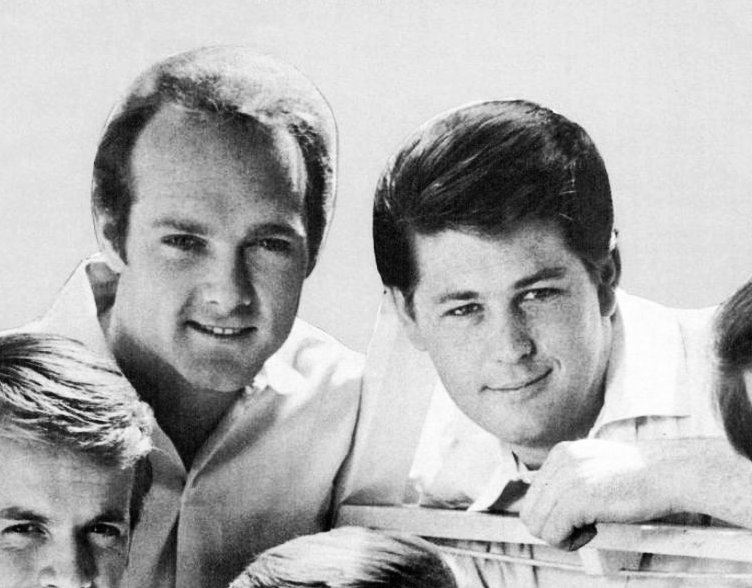
Brian Wilson (right) composed most of Today! in conjunction with lyricist Mike Love (left)

By this point, principal songwriter Brian Wilson had become overwhelmed by professional and personal pressures. Wilson later explained, "I used to be Mr Everything ... I was run down mentally and emotionally because I was running around, jumping on jets from one city to another on one-night stands, also producing, writing, arranging, singing, planning, teaching – to the point where I had no peace of mind and no chance to actually sit down and think or even rest." He also expressed dissatisfaction with the group's business operations and believed that the quality of their records had declined as a result. During the European tour, frontman and lyricist Mike Love told Melody Maker that the group sought to move beyond surf music and avoid repeating themselves. Asked how he felt about originating the surfing sound, Wilson rejected the label, stated that the band did not play surf music, and that their focus was a teen-oriented sound applicable to any theme: "We're just gonna stay on the life of a social teenager."

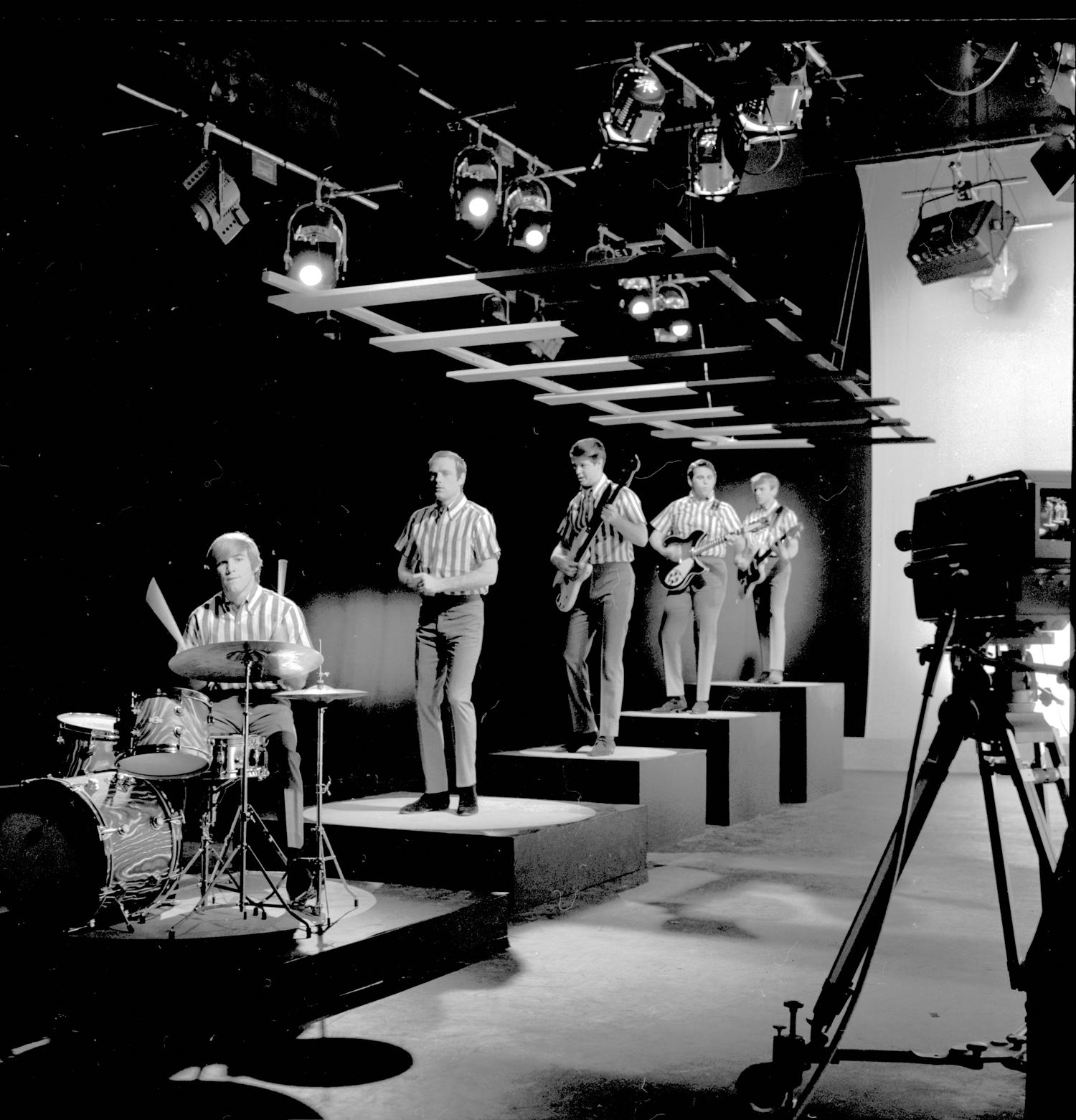
The Beach Boys performing "Dance, Dance, Dance" at NBC TV studio, December 18, 1964

Wilson was also increasingly anxious about his relationship with singer Marilyn Rovell. During the European tour, he began drinking more heavily and turned to songwriting as an outlet. On December 7, seeking emotional stability, he married Rovell. On December 18, while en route to a U.S. tour stop in Houston, Wilson suffered a breakdown, sobbing uncontrollably during the flight. Al Jardine, seated beside him, later said, "None of us had ever witnessed something like that." Wilson performed the Houston show but was replaced by session musician Glen Campbell for the remainder of the tour. It marked the first time he had missed Beach Boys concert dates since 1963.

In the following weeks, the group resumed recording and completed the tracks for The Beach Boys Today! Wilson then informed his bandmates he would withdraw from touring indefinitely. (Note: Band archivist Craig Slowinski suggested Wilson made this announcement after the vocal session for "Kiss Me, Baby".) He said, "I told them I foresee a beautiful future for the Beach Boys group, but the only way we could achieve it was if they did their job and I did mine." (Note: Wilson recalled that Love "couldn't take the reality", Dennis threatened "some people" in the room with an ashtray, Al Jardine "broke out in tears", and Carl Wilson "was the only one who never got into a bad emotional scene. ... He cooled Dennis, Mike and Al down." Love wrote in his 2016 memoir, "I wasn't angry [about Wilson's decision] (unlike his father, who accused Brian of abandoning his responsibilities). I understood—we all did, I think.") According to Barry Mann and Cynthia Weil, Wilson was profoundly affected by Phil Spector's latest production, "You've Lost That Lovin' Feelin'", released in November 1964. He later told a journalist that his decision to stop touring was partly due to jealousy over Spector and the Beatles. Journalist Nick Kent reported that Wilson had also been "listening intently" to the work of Burt Bacharach and Hal David.

== Style ==
=== Orchestrations and concept ===
The Beach Boys Today! marked a stylistic departure from previous Beach Boys LPs and was their most musically sophisticated to date, featuring more complex and innovative arrangements. Academic Jadey O'Regan identified it as the beginning of a period marked by unorthodox structures, "dense vocal harmonies", and eclectic orchestral textures uncommon in contemporary popular music. Musicologist Phillip Lambert rejected the notion that "Brian wrote B-side songs before his December catharsis and A-side songs in the sunny glow of his subsequent freedom", believing that the compositions which preceded his plane episode still showed evidence of progressive ingenuity.

Structured as a concept album, the first side consists of uptempo tracks, while the second side contains ballads. Music historian James Perone described the sequencing as a sustained exploration of mood, forming a cohesive work rather than a set of unrelated songs, although the consistency is broken by the inclusion of the filler track "Bull Session with the "Big Daddy"", which concludes the album.

Many of Wilson's compositions were written while using marijuana; in his memoir, he stated that it altered how he perceived arrangements, in a separate interview, he elaborated that it deepened his commitment to music, particularly on a spiritual level. Author David Howard argued that marijuana had an immediate effect on Wilson’s songwriting and production, contributing to slower tempos, "more expansive" arrangements, introspective lyrics, and denser mixes. (Note: Wilson's regular use of the drug, which had been introduced to him by industry acquaintance Loren Schwartz, had intensified his marital tensions at the time.)

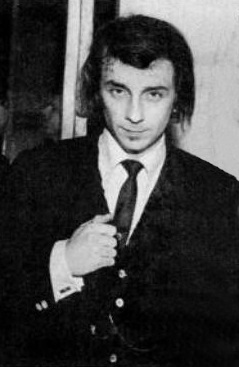
Today!'s orchestral sound was influenced by producer Phil Spector

Unlike previous albums, none of the songs rely solely on standard rock instrumentation. Seven of the eleven tracks feature orchestral-style arrangements, while the others augment basic rock set-ups with instruments the band did not play themselves. These included accordion, autoharp, English horn, oboe, electric mandolin, and French horn. Additional percussion included sleigh bells, timbales, and triangles.

Wilson used his falsetto on nine tracks, the most since Surfer Girl (1963), owing to the album's greater emphasis on ballads. Dennis Wilson, who rarely sang lead vocals, did so on the opening and closing tracks, "Do You Wanna Dance?" and "In the Back of My Mind", respectively. Brian explained that he gave Dennis more vocal leads because he felt Dennis had been underused.

=== Themes and musical structures ===
In songs like "She Knows Me Too Well" and "In the Back of My Mind", Wilson's dream lovers were suddenly no longer simple happy souls harmonizing their sun-kissed innocence and dying devotion to each other over a honey-coated backdrop of surf and sand. Instead, they'd become highly vulnerable, slightly neurotic and riddled with telling insecurities.

— NME journalist Nick Kent, 1975

Wilson adopted a more introspective and autobiographical lyrical approach, writing from the perspective of vulnerable, anxious narrators plagued by emotional insecurity and self-doubt. All of the lyrics are in the first person and omit references to cars or surfing. Instead, they reflect a more mature view of romantic relationships, and address introspective themes, such as personal growth. Author Charles Granata described the lyrics as unified by the subject of "adolescent love" and emotional longing, contrasting them with the group's earlier, more superficial depictions of girls, cars, and surfing.

Most songs express anticipation or unease about the future, while continuing the group's focus on teenage experience. Journalist Alice Bolin observed that, despite Wilson’s age at the time, the lyrics retained a childlike quality that could appear "unsettling", particularly in light of his continued interest in adolescent themes when scrutinized against his 22-year-old perspective. Author Bob Stanley wrote that Wilson aimed for a lyrical style akin to Johnny Mercer but instead produced something resembling "proto-indie".

The album includes more verse-chorus structures than previous Beach Boys LPs. Songs such as "When I Grow Up", "Kiss Me, Baby", and "Please Let Me Wonder" incorporate jazz harmonies and relations. O'Regan cited these tracks as examples of how lyrical and formal development were reflected in Wilson's expanded flexibility of the verse-chorus format. She described the album as the group’s "clearest" pre-1967 example of lyrical and structural experimentation.

Side two introduced major seventh and major ninth chords, which, according to O'Regan, tempered the energy of side one. Journalist Scott Interrante wrote that the ballads were not necessarily more sophisticated than the uptempo tracks, explaining that Wilson applied comparable harmonic and structural complexity to both styles. He added that the upbeat songs also conveyed forward-looking themes and an undercurrent of unease, with tracks such as "Good to My Baby" and "Don't Hurt My Little Sister" showcasing musical and lyrical complexity beneath an appearance of simplicity.

== Recording ==
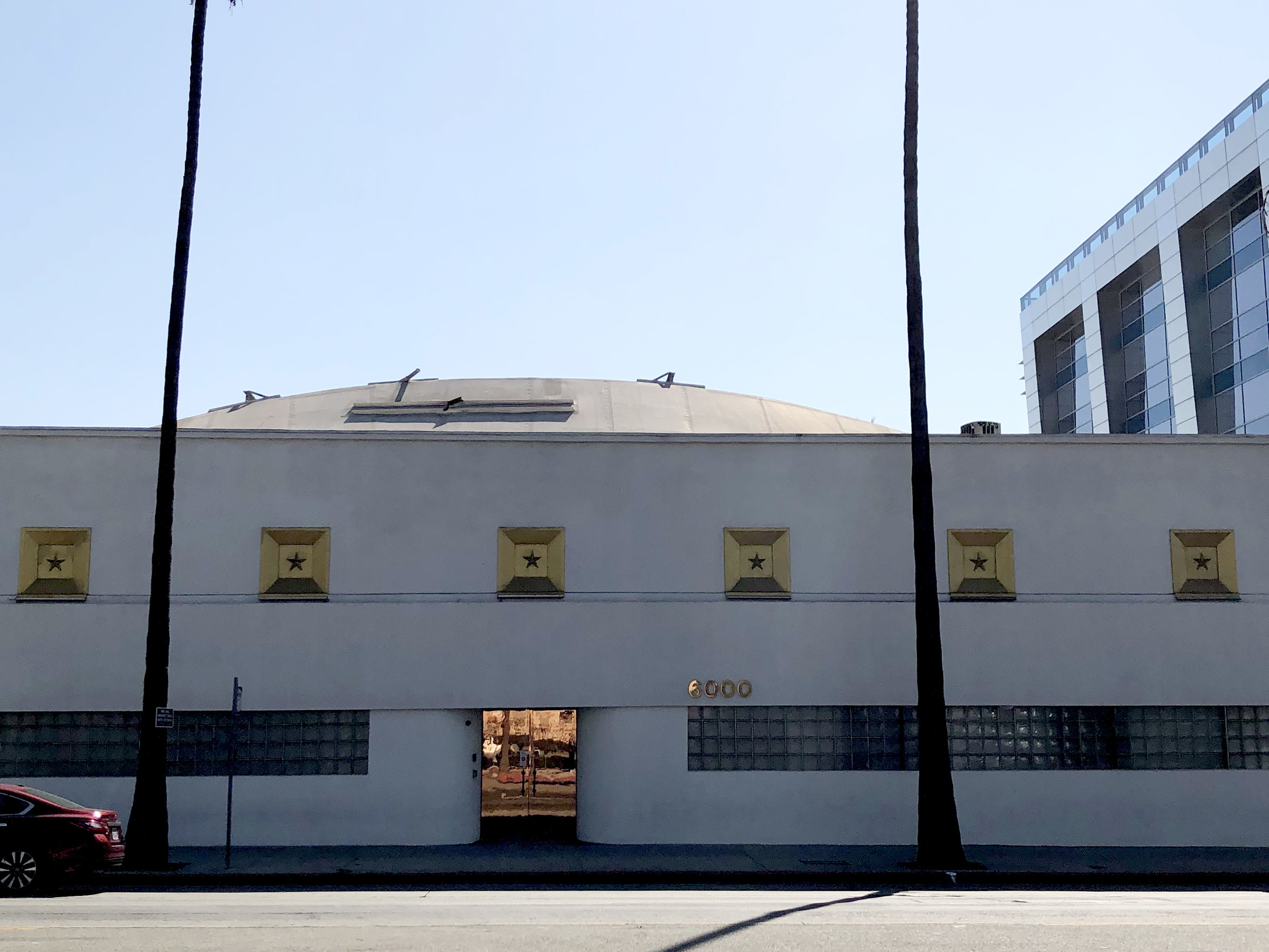
Entrance of Western Studio on Sunset Boulevard (2019)

The Beach Boys Today! was largely recorded between January 7 and 19, 1965, at Western Studio in Hollywood. Other studios used were Gold Star ("Do You Wanna Dance?") and RCA Victor ("Dance, Dance, Dance"). Four songs were recorded in the previous year: "She Knows Me Too Well" and "Don't Hurt My Little Sister" (June), "When I Grow Up (To Be a Man)" (August), "Dance, Dance, Dance" (October), and the backing track for "Kiss Me, Baby" (December 16).

Wilson had been employing the services of Phil Spector's session musicians (later known as "the Wrecking Crew") since the Surfer Girl sessions. He used them to a greater degree on Today!, with the number of studio musicians used for each track usually exceeding 11 players, while performance takes ran to the 30s. Dillon writes that the further takes "showed his studio skills were sharper than ever and [that he] was increasingly demanding of both the session musicians and the group." Wilson's 2016 memoir states that, following the airplane episode, he had endeavored to "take the things I learned from Phil Spector and use more instruments whenever I could. I doubled up on basses and tripled up on keyboards, which made everything sound bigger and deeper."

The recording process typically involved recording an instrumental on two tracks of 3-track tape with one remaining track left for the first vocal overdub. This tape was then dubbed down to a second tape for an additional layer of vocal overdubs. Today! was ultimately mixed down to mono and was their first album not to be issued in stereo since Surfin' U.S.A. (1963). Select tracks from the album were later remixed for stereo on Beach Boys compilation albums. A complete stereo mix of Today! was first released in 2012.

== Contents ==
=== Side one ===
==== "Do You Wanna Dance?" ====
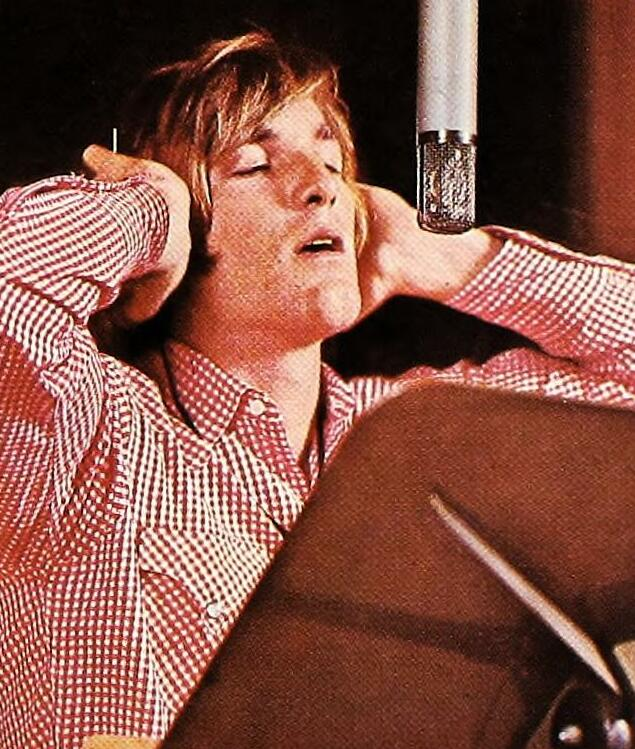
Dennis Wilson bookends the album with lead vocals on "Do You Wanna Dance?" and "In the Back of My Mind"

"Do You Wanna Dance?" is a cover of the R&B song by Bobby Freeman, who had a top 10 hit with it in 1958. It is distinguished from the original through its lush orchestration, three-part vocal arrangement, and instrumental bridge key change. Dillon speculated that the rendition may have been inspired by Del Shannon's recent recording, although the Beach Boys' version more closely resembles an earlier version by Cliff Richard and the Shadows. It was the first song the group recorded at Gold Star, Spector's favorite studio, and their second song that employed a timpani. (Note: "Pom, Pom Play Girl" was the first.)

==== "Good to My Baby" ====
"Good to My Baby" is about a man responding to criticisms regarding the way he treats his girlfriend. Interrante opined that while it is not "musically exciting or complex", the defensive and anxious tone "running throughout the song adds a dark quality that’s not immediately on the surface, and ultimately makes 'Good to My Baby' all the more interesting." O'Regan attributes the use of a major supertonic function (II) with giving "the [chord] progression a surprising lift under the positivity of the lyrics – it reaffirms the confidence the singer feels about his relationship, despite what others may think."

==== "Don't Hurt My Little Sister" ====
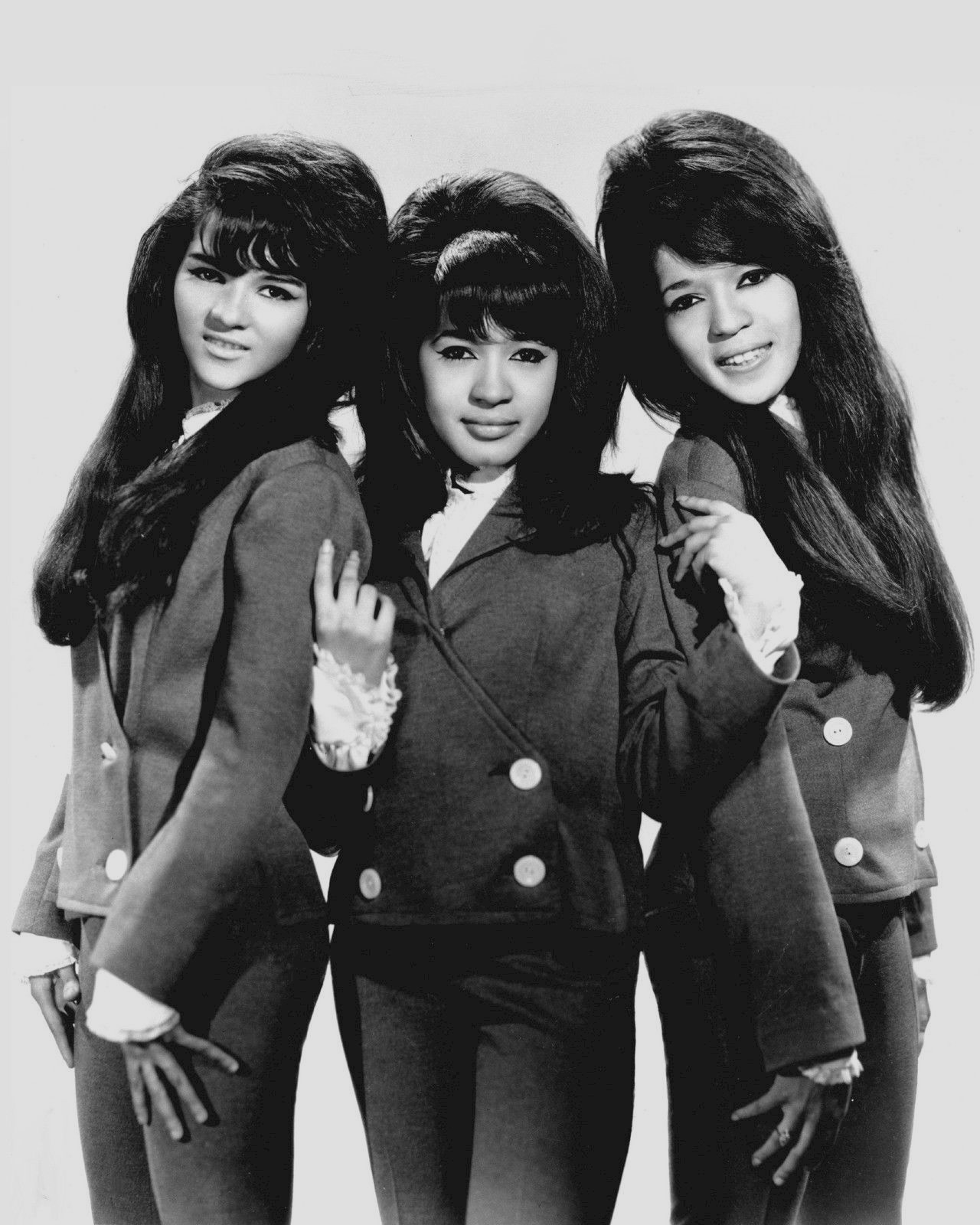
"Don't Hurt My Little Sister" was written for the Ronettes, Phil Spector's girl group

"Don't Hurt My Little Sister" depicts a brother's protective stance entangled with romantic overtones. According to Wilson's 2016 memoir, it was written "about me and the Rovells. I wrote it from the perspective of one of them telling me not to treat another one of them badly." Carlin described the song’s subject as echoing Diane Rovell's warning during the early stages of Brian and Marilyn's relationship, "only with an uncomfortable fraternal ardor: Why don’t you love her like her big brother?"

Wilson composed the song for the Ronettes, modeling its structure on Spector's work, and submitted it to him. Spector rewrote the lyrics, retitled it "Things Are Changing (For the Better)", and recorded it with the Blossoms. Wilson, originally slated to play piano, was dismissed from the session after an unsatisfactory performance. He later reused the song’s refrain chord progression in "California Girls" (1965).

==== "When I Grow Up (To Be a Man)" ====
"When I Grow Up (To Be a Man)"
"When I Grow Up (To Be a Man)" features multiple key changes, a hook based on a dissonant, functionally ambiguous chord, tempo stretches, and a long pause as a climax.

"When I Grow Up (To Be a Man)" centers on a boy’s anxiety about aging out of adolescence. Brian told the Birmingham Post, "When I was younger, I used to worry about turning into an old square over the years. I don't think I will now, and that is what inspired 'When I Grow Up'." In 2011, he recalled having a bleak view of his future when writing the song. In his 2016 memoir, Love wrote that the song was "probably influenced" by band publisher and father Murry Wilson, who frequently challenged Brian's manhood.

The lyrics include the question, "Will I love my wife for the rest of my life?" This marked the first Beach Boys lyric to address falling out of love rather than entering or exiting a relationship. Critic Richard Meltzer cited the song as the moment when the Beach Boys "abruptly ceased to be boys". It was among the first rock songs to address impending adulthood and may have been the earliest U.S. top 40 record to include the phrase "turn on" ("will I still like the things that turned me on as a kid?").

Granata wrote that the song "best exemplifies the [band's] musical growth" through its use of "odd sounds" and "full and round" vocal harmonies. Except for the harmonica, the instrumentation was performed by the group, requiring 37 takes. O'Regan cited the drum part for eschewing a conventional backbeat in favor of fills that interacted with the vocal rhythm; each drum element functioned "horizontally as four separate parts, rather than a whole set working together."

==== "Help Me, Ronda" ====
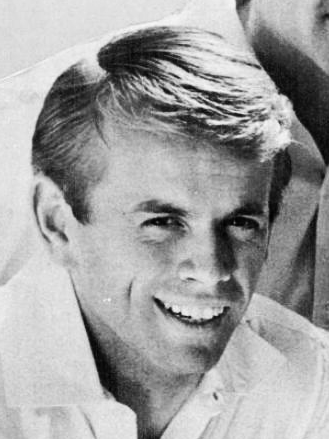
"Help Me, Ronda" featured a rare lead vocal from rhythm guitarist Al Jardine

"Help Me, Ronda" is about someone whose fiance left him for another man and subsequently begs for a woman named Ronda to "help me get her out of my heart" with a one-night stand. It was sung by Al Jardine, his second ever lead vocal for the group. (Note: The first was "Christmas Day" (1964).) Wilson and Love denied speculation that the "Ronda" mentioned in the lyric was based on a real-life person, although Love said that the opening lines drew from his high school experiences.

Wilson said that he came up with the song while "fooling around on the piano" playing Bobby Darin's "Mack the Knife" with its "cool, shuffle beat". O'Regan felt that "the uneven rhythm" represented "both the limping pain from the previous relationship, and the heart-skipping feeling of new love." The song ends with a series of fake fade-outs, described by journalist Alexis Petridis as "undercutting the triumphant chorus with a weird sense of uncertainty."

==== "Dance, Dance, Dance" ====
"Dance, Dance, Dance", written in a similar vein as "I Get Around", is about escaping emotional stress through music and dancing. It is their first song with a writing credit to Carl Wilson, who devised the guitar riff. Interrante praised the band's performance on the track: "Despite being joined by some studio players, it's Carl’s 12-string playing, especially his solo, and Dennis Wilson's ecstatic drumming that are the real driving forces behind the song." An earlier version of the song, recorded in Nashville in September 1964, was included as a bonus track on the album's 1990 reissue.

=== Side two ===
==== "Please Let Me Wonder" ====
"Please Let Me Wonder"
According to journalist Scott Interrante, "'Please Let Me Wonder' marks the true departure from Phil Spector’s wall-of-sound and into Brian's own distinct producing style".

"Please Let Me Wonder" was the first song Wilson wrote under the influence of marijuana. It is about a man who is afraid that a woman will reveal that she does not love him, and so he instead prefers to fantasize that she does. Wilson said that he did the song "as a tribute to Phil Spector", although the arrangement, which highlights different, individual instruments throughout the song, was in direct contrast to the methods employed by Spector for his Wall of Sound.

The instrumentation includes drums, timpani, tambourine, bass, two guitars, acoustic guitar, piano, tack piano, organ, horns, and vibraphone. In Howard's description, the song "specifically demonstrates" Wilson's "newfound insight" of "deconstruct[ing] songs into tiny increments and deal with each instrument individually, stacking sounds one at a time."

==== "I'm So Young" ====
"I'm So Young" is a rendition of the 1958 doo-wop hit originally performed by the Students. Wilson chose to record the song because another version by the Ronettes' Veronica Bennett had recently been issued as a single. In contrast to the album's other cover song, "Do You Wanna Dance?", the Beach Boys' approach to "I'm So Young" deviated minimally from the original. Interrante pointed to the outro (a feature that Wilson invented for his version) as the arrangement's most "innovative" quality. An earlier version of the band's recording, containing a flute and a more prominent bassline, was released on the album's 1990 reissue. Wilson soon revisited the song's "too young to get married" lyrical theme for the group's "Wouldn't It Be Nice" (1966).

==== "Kiss Me, Baby" ====
"Kiss Me, Baby" (2012 stereo mix)
The dynamic arrangement and present-minded thematic concern on "Kiss Me, Baby" portended the style that Wilson developed on the band's 1966 album Pet Sounds.

"Kiss Me, Baby" concerns a quarrel between the narrator and his lover, followed by an attempt at reconciliation. Wilson began writing the song while walking through a red-light district in Copenhagen days after proposing to his fiancée. According to Love, the "wistful bass line ... led to my lyrics about a guy who has a disagreement with his girlfriend, even though they can't even remember what they fought about, leaving them both brokenhearted." Dillon referred to it as "a ballad that pleaded for the romantic reconciliation [Wilson] anticipated with Marilyn." Interrante, by contrast, wrote that it differed from the album's other songs in not paralleling Wilson's personal life and instead focused "on coming to terms with the present."

The arrangement includes basses, guitars, saxophone, pianos, vibraphone, drums, temple blocks—soon to become a Wilson hallmark—as well as English horn and French horn. Doo-wop background vocals repeatedly sing "Kiss a little bit, fight a little bit" in the chorus and outro. Interrante characterized it as one of Wilson's "most interesting compositions" and featuring "some of the thickest and most beautiful harmonies the group had pulled off up to that point." Stebbins described the track as "the pinnacle of balladry" and one of the group's "most romantic and emotional songs". A vocals-only mix appeared on the 2003 compilation Hawthorne, CA.

==== "She Knows Me Too Well" ====
"She Knows Me Too Well"
The music in "She Knows Me Too Well" is sparse compared to other Today! tracks. Its dissonant harmonic development helps convey the song's lyricism about a man who struggles with his treatment of women.

"She Knows Me Too Well" concerns a narrator who expresses self-criticism over his treatment of his girlfriend and acknowledges his jealousy and double standards. He rationalizes his behavior by asserting that "she can tell I really love her". Wilson described the song as an homage to Burt Bacharach. It was the first track recorded for the album. The initial version, taped in June 1964, was discarded and re-recorded in August during the same session as "When I Grow Up". The earlier version was intended as an A-side before it was relegated to the B-side of "When I Grow Up". A high-pitched percussion sound was produced by striking a microphone boom pole with a screwdriver.

==== "In the Back of My Mind" ====
"In the Back of My Mind" depicts a narrator who believes he is "blessed with everything", but harbors an unfounded fear that his relationship will collapse. Its arrangement features dissonance and instruments including saxophone, strings, and oboe. Dennis Wilson sang the lead vocal without backing harmonies. It is one of the group's songs that most heavily draw from the Tin Pan Alley style of songwriting, and, in Lambert's view, contains chord progressions "virtually unprecedented in Brian's work". The song concludes with an asynchronous instrumental breakdown.

It is regarded among fans and critics as one of the band's "masterpieces". Peter Doggett wrote that Dennis "showed for the first time an awareness that his voice could be a blunt emotional instrument." Granata called the track "disturbing" and "the antithesis of any prescribed commercial formula—a curious experiment marking an extreme deviation from the band." Howard described its "stony lead vocal" and "warped string arrangement" as Wilson's "most ambitious arrangement to date." A 1975 solo piano version by Brian was later issued as a bonus track on the deluxe edition of his 2015 solo album No Pier Pressure.

==== "Bull Session with the 'Big Daddy'" ====
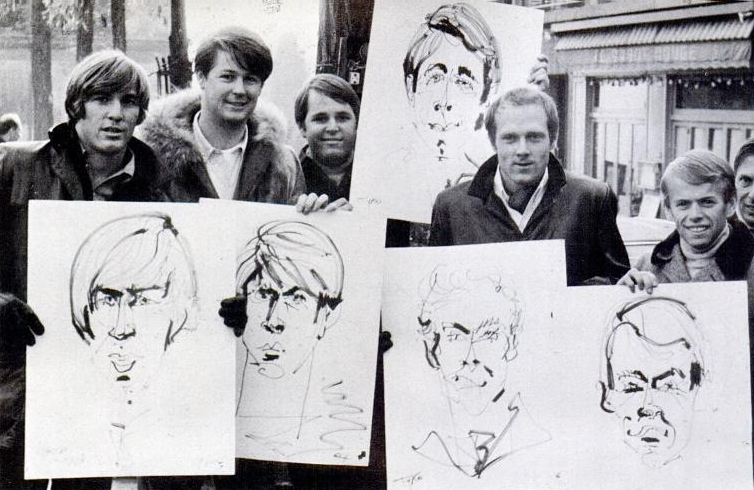
The Beach Boys in Europe, late 1964.

"Bull Session with the 'Big Daddy'" ends the album with a spoof interview of the band, conducted by journalist Earl Leaf, in which they discuss the group's recent tour of Europe. The track is a 2-minute edit of a recording that originally ran for over 20 minutes. At one point, Brian remarks, "Well, I haven't made a mistake yet in my whole career", to which Love adds, "Brian, we keep waiting for you to make a mistake."

=== Leftover songs ===
"All Dressed Up for School" was a leftover track recorded by the band on September 14, 1964. The song was originally written by Wilson and Love for the singer Sharon Marie, as "What'll I Wear to School Today". Lambert described "All Dressed Up for School" as "packed with musical invention" despite being "unsuitable for release in 1964." In 1990, it was released as a bonus track on a reissue of Little Deuce Coupe and All Summer Long.

"Guess I'm Dumb", written by Wilson and producer Russ Titelman, was tracked on October 14, 1964. Wilson's 2016 memoir states: "When I was finished, no one from the band wanted to sing it. The message was okay, but maybe it was just the idea of being dumb." In March 1965, Wilson gave the song to Glen Campbell, whose version was released as a single that June, as a show of thanks for his services with the touring group.

== Release and initial reception ==
Contemporary professional ratings
Review scores
Source	Rating
Record Mirror	3/5 stars

Three tracks from the album were issued on two singles in the months prior to the LP's release. "When I Grow Up (To Be a Man)" (B-side "She Knows Me Too Well") was issued on August 24 and peaked at number 9 in the U.S. and number 27 in the UK. On October 26, it was followed with "Dance, Dance, Dance", reaching number 8 in the U.S. and number 24 in the UK. On November 28, the band were filmed for the concert film T.A.M.I. Show, playing "Dance, Dance, Dance" and other hits.

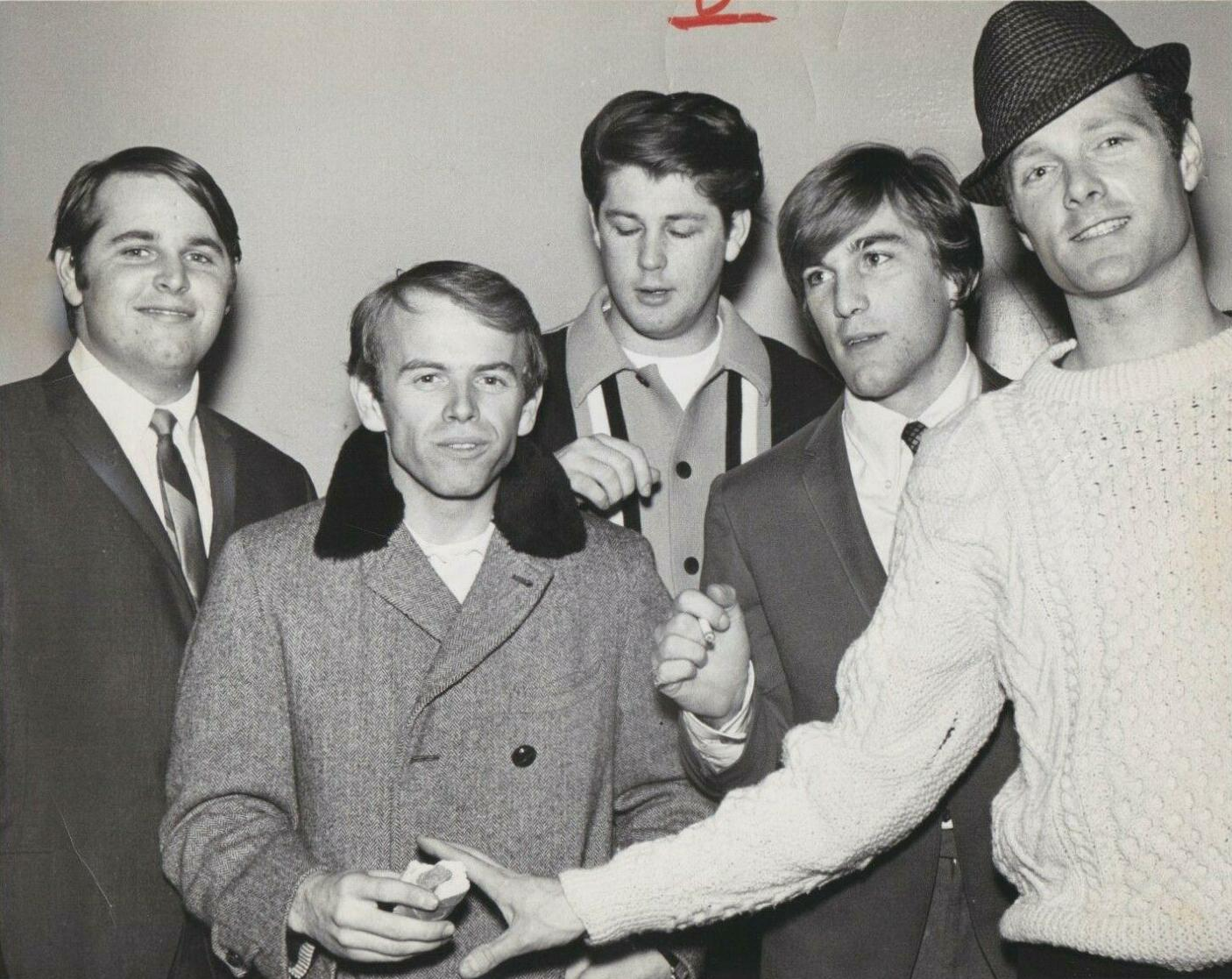
The Beach Boys backstage at the Philadelphia Convention Hall, February 1965

From January 27 to February 27, 1965, the band toured North America, with Campbell again substituting for Wilson. On February 15, "Do You Wanna Dance?" (B-side "Please Let Me Wonder"), was issued as the third single, peaking at number 12 in the US. (Note: It was the first of only two Beach Boys A-sides that featured a Dennis lead, the other being "Slip On Through".) On February 28, the band (with Brian) appeared on Shindig! performing "Do You Wanna Dance?" and a truncated version of "Please Let Me Wonder".

Released on March 8, The Beach Boys Today! was a great commercial success, rising to number four in the Billboard charts on May 1. In April, a rerecorded version of "Help Me, Ronda" (retitled "Help Me, Rhonda") was issued as a single, becoming the group's second number-one hit in the US. This version of the song was included on the band's next LP, Summer Days (And Summer Nights!!), released in July. On October 1, the RIAA awarded Today! gold certification, indicating over 500,000 units sold.

The San Francisco Examiner called the album "entertaining but a disappointment in relation to past efforts", and panned the inclusion of "Bull Session with the 'Big Daddy'". The Anaheim Bulletin, however, admired the LP's final track, deeming it "a talkie, natural, behind-the-scenes-type informal gab session."

In the UK, Today! was released in April 1966 and peaked at number 6. Reviewing the album for London Life, Barry Fantoni described the "marvellous" production and numerous "really beautiful tunes" as displaying the Beach Boys at their peak. The Record Mirror review rued, "Must garner sales, even if it doesn't really extend the Beach Boy talents particularly".

== Retrospective assessments ==
Retrospective professional ratings
Review scores
Source	Rating
AllMusic	5/5 stars
Blender (Today!/Summer Days reissue)	4/5 stars
The Encyclopedia of Popular Music	4/5 stars
MusicHound Rock	4/5 stars
The Rolling Stone Album Guide	4/5 stars

The Beach Boys Today! has attracted much acclaim, although most of the critical attention has been reserved for the second side of the record. Writing in the book Icons of Rock, Scott Schinder referred to the ballad side as "startling, both in their lyrical vulnerability and their distinctive arrangements." Petridis opined that the "overlooked first half is equally fascinating" for its emotional content, noting that "even the filler of "Don't Hurt My Little Sister" carries a slightly dark undercurrent."

On the band's subsequent releases, Wilson's writing and production style continued to grow in its sophistication, to the extent that writers often refer to the second side of the record as a precursor to the 1966 album Pet Sounds. Writing for PopMatters, Bolin called Today! "an important artifact, with its sound forming a link between the Beach Boys' doo-wop-influenced beginnings and the lush and orchestral Pet Sounds. Interrante wrote that it was "an exciting album" that showed early signs of Wilson "blur[ring] the lines between ballad and uptempo songs", and that in contrast to Pet Sounds, "Today! is about the optimism, not the sadness, of leaving adolescence."

Less favorably, biographer Steven Gaines criticized Today! as "not one of Brian's best works, consisting mostly of a melange of uninspired car tunes [sic] ..." Reviewing the album for AllMusic, Richie Unterberger declared that it was "strong almost from start to finish." Similarly, Schinder wrote that it "would have been the first Beach Boys LP to be sublime from beginning to end, were it not for the closing track". Interrante said of "Bull Session with the 'Big Daddy'", "one seriously questions why it was included at all. ... I think we can all agree that the album would be better off without it." Bolin decreed that "it can be hard to separate Today! from the masterpiece it led to – so much so that Today! can feel like a rehearsal for Pet Sounds, with its themes and ideas repeated and perfected in the later album." However, she also states that "to hear it only in relation to Pet Sounds would be to undermine what a strange and original work Today! really is."

Today! regularly appears on "top album lists" conducted by publications such as Rolling Stone. In 2005, it was included in the book 1001 Albums You Must Hear Before You Die. In the book, David Hutcheon of The Sunday Times expressed his belief that although the album contained what he perceived as "the worst track in [the] entire book," he believed it to be "the perfect Beach Boys LP". In 2007, The Guardian included it among "1000 Albums to Hear Before You Die". In 2012, it was ranked number 271 on Rolling Stone's list of the "500 Greatest Albums of All Time", with the entry stating, "Brian Wilson was already a genius. He writes sweet California tunes here, and the haunting 'She Knows Me Too Well' hits Pet Sounds-deep." On the list's 2020 edition, the record's position descended to number 466.

== Impact and legacy ==
With Today!, the Beach Boys established themselves as album artists rather than just a singles band. Schinder credited its "suite-like structure" with presenting "an early manifestation of the rock album format being used to make a cohesive artistic statement – an idea that Brian would soon explore more fully." Bolin similarly recognized it as the band's "first flirtation with the album-as-art form. Journalist Paul Lester writes that the album "set new standards for rock", while Interrante echoes that its "intricate and sophisticated music ... brought the group, and pop music in general to a new place."

Record producer Phil Ramone states that, while some of the album's more unusual instrumental groupings might have been explored by jazz musicians like Claude Thornhill and Gil Evans, Wilson was pioneering in incorporating these unique combinations of instruments into the realm of mainstream pop music. In his book 1965: The Most Revolutionary Year in Music (2015), Andrew Grant credits Today! with inaugurating "the era of baroque pop, a.k.a. chamber pop, in which bands fused elements of classical with rock".

In Perone's belief, Today! began the reciprocal chain of influence between the Beatles and the Beach Boys, inspiring "at least" part of the Beatles' Rubber Soul (1965). (Note: In turn, Rubber Soul inspired Pet Sounds. The Beatles completed the chain with the Pet Sounds-influenced Sgt. Pepper's Lonely Hearts Club Band (1967).) My Bloody Valentine frontman Kevin Shields recalled that during a U.S. tour supporting Isn't Anything (1989), a fan gave him a cassette copy of Today! and Pet Sounds, which subsequently influenced his production approach on records such as Loveless (1991).

== Reissues and compilations ==
- In 1971, Today! was reissued by Capitol as a double LP and Cassette (Along with "Fun, Fun, Fun"), with a different Title as Dance, Dance, Dance, minus 2 songs.
- In 1981, Today! was reissued by Capitol with a different Title as Dance, Dance, Dance on LP & Cassette Tape formats.
- In 1990, Today! was packaged with Summer Days for a CD reissue that included alternate takes of "Dance, Dance, Dance" and "I'm So Young" as bonus tracks.
- In 2012, Capitol issued a remastered mono and stereo edition of the album.
- In 2014, Capitol released Keep an Eye on Summer – The Beach Boys Sessions 1964, a rarities compilation that included alternate versions of "She Knows Me Too Well", "Don't Hurt My Little Sister", "When I Grow Up (To Be a Man)", "I'm So Young", "All Dressed Up for School", and "Dance, Dance, Dance".

== Track listing ==
Lead vocals per Craig Slowinski.

Side one
No.	Title	Writer(s)	Lead vocal(s)	Length
1.	"Do You Wanna Dance?"	Bobby Freeman	Dennis Wilson	2:19
2.	"Good to My Baby"	Brian Wilson; Mike Love	B. Wilson with Love	2:16
3.	"Don't Hurt My Little Sister"	B. Wilson; Love	Love with B. Wilson	2:07
4.	"When I Grow Up (To Be a Man)"	B. Wilson; Love	Love with B. Wilson	2:01
5.	"Help Me, Ronda"	B. Wilson; Love	Al Jardine	3:10
6.	"Dance, Dance, Dance"	B. Wilson; Carl Wilson; Love	Love with B. Wilson	1:59

Side two
No.	Title	Writer(s)	Lead vocal(s)	Length
1.	"Please Let Me Wonder"	B. Wilson; Love	B. Wilson with Love	2:45
2.	"I'm So Young"	William H. "Prez" Tyus, Jr.	B. Wilson	2:30
3.	"Kiss Me, Baby"	B. Wilson; Love	B. Wilson with Love	2:35
4.	"She Knows Me Too Well"	B. Wilson; Love	B. Wilson	2:27
5.	"In the Back of My Mind"	B. Wilson; Love	D. Wilson	2:07
6.	"Bull Session with the 'Big Daddy'"		audio vérité	2:10
Total length:				28:54

The Beach Boys Today! / Summer Days (And Summer Nights!!) 1990/2001 CD reissue bonus tracks
No.	Title	Writer(s)	Lead vocal(s)	Length
25.	"The Little Girl I Once Knew"	B. Wilson	B. Wilson, Love with C. Wilson	2:40
26.	"Dance, Dance, Dance" (alternate take)	B. Wilson; C. Wilson; Love	Love with B. Wilson	2:02
27.	"I'm So Young" (alternate take)	Tyus	B. Wilson	2:29
28.	"Let Him Run Wild" (alternate take)	B. Wilson; Love	B. Wilson	2:18
29.	"Graduation Day"	Joe Sherman; Noel Sherman	Love with B. Wilson	2:18

Note

- "Kiss Me, Baby" and "Please Let Me Wonder" were originally the only tracks on the album that listed a writing credit to Mike Love. Following his 1994 lawsuit, Love v. Wilson, he was awarded co-writing credits to seven more songs: "Good to My Baby", "Don't Hurt My Little Sister", "When I Grow Up (To Be a Man)", "Help Me, Ronda", "Dance, Dance, Dance", "She Knows Me Too Well", and "In the Back of My Mind".

== Personnel ==
Per band archivist Craig Slowinski.

The Beach Boys

- Al Jardine – lead (5), harmony (1, 4, 6–10) and backing vocals (1–4, 6–10), electric rhythm guitar (6), bass guitar (3–4, 8, 10)
- Mike Love – lead (2–4, 6, 9), harmony (1, 4–10) and backing vocals (1–10), spoken word (12)
- Brian Wilson – lead (2–4, 6–10), harmony (1, 4–7, 9–10) and backing vocals (1–7, 9–11), spoken word (12), four (6) and six-string bass guitar (8), grand (1–2), upright (3–4, 7, 9–10) and tack piano, Baldwin harpsichord (4), Farfisa (7) and Hammond organ (8), production (8, 11), mixing (8), conductor (11)
- Carl Wilson – harmony (1, 4–10) and backing vocals (1–2, 4–11), spoken word (12), lead (1–11), rhythm (1–4, 8, 10), and 12-string guitar (1, 3, 5, 8), six-string bass guitar (8)
- Dennis Wilson – lead (1, 11), harmony (4–10), backing (2–10) and double-tracked vocals (11), spoken word (12), drums (4, 6, 8, 10), percussion (7), hi-hat (4), tambourine (3, 7), tom-tom (7)

Guests

- Earl Leaf – spoken word (12)
- "Louie" (last name unknown) – castanets
- Russ Titelman – percussion (microphone boom hit with screwdriver) (10)
- Ron Swallow – tambourine (2, 5, 7–8), woodblock (7)
- Marilyn Wilson – harmony (1) and backing vocals (1), spoken word (12)

Session musicians (later known as "the Wrecking Crew")

- Hal Blaine – drums (1–3, 5, 9, 11), woodblocks (1), sleigh bells (6), triangle (6), tambourine (6), castanets (6), temple block (9, 11), claves (1), timbales (5, 11)
- Glen Campbell – 12-string acoustic guitar (5–7)
- Peter Christ – cor anglais (9, 11)
- Steve Douglas – tenor saxophone (1–2, 5–7, 9, 11)
- David Duke – French horn (9)
- John Gray – grand piano (3)
- Carl Fortina – accordion (6)
- Plas Johnson – tenor saxophone (1–2, 5, 7, 11)
- Carol Kaye – bass guitar (2, 7, 9, 11)
- Barney Kessel – classical guitar (7), 12-string guitar (9)
- Larry Knechtel – bass guitar (1)
- Carrol Lewis – double-reed harmonica (4)
- Jack Nimitz – baritone saxophone (7)
- Jay Migliori – baritone saxophone (1–2, 5–6, 9, 11)
- Earl Palmer – drums (7), timbales (7)
- Don Randi – grand (7) and tack upright piano (2), organ (2, 7, 11)
- Bill Pitman – electric guitar (1–2, 5), acoustic guitar (1–2, 9, 11)
- Ray Pohlman – baritone guitar (3), bass guitar (3, 5–6, 9)
- Billy Lee Riley – double-reed harmonica (5, 7, 11)
- Leon Russell – grand piano (5, 9), organ (1), vibraphone (11)
- Billy Strange – acoustic (7) and electric guitar (2, 9, 11), electric mandolin (1), ukulele (5)
- Tommy Tedesco – autoharp (2, 11), baritone (1) and electric guitar (2–3), mandolin (1)
- Julius Wechter – vibraphone (9), bell tree (9), timpani (1), tambourine (1), congas (2), claves (5)
- Jerry Williams – vibraphone (7), timpani (7)
- unknown – oboe, cellos, violins, violas, English horn

Technical staff

- Chuck Britz – engineer (1, 3, 5, 8, 10–11)
- Larry Levine – engineer (1)

== Charts ==
Weekly charts
Chart (1965–1966)	Peak position
UK Record Retailer	6
US Billboard 200	4

== Bibliography ==
- Badman, Keith (2004). The Beach Boys: The Definitive Diary of America's Greatest Band, on Stage and in the Studio. Backbeat Books. ISBN 978-0-87930-818-6.
- Carlin, Peter Ames (2006). Catch a Wave: The Rise, Fall, and Redemption of the Beach Boys' Brian Wilson. Rodale. ISBN 978-1-59486-320-2.
- Dillon, Mark (2012). Fifty Sides of the Beach Boys: The Songs That Tell Their Story. ECW Press. ISBN 978-1-77090-198-8.
- Doggett, Peter (1997). "Holy Man and Slow Booze: Dennis Wilson". In Abbott, Kingsley (ed.). Back to the Beach: A Brian Wilson and the Beach Boys Reader. Helter Skelter. ISBN 978-1-90092-402-3.
- Gaines, Steven (1986). Heroes and Villains: The True Story of The Beach Boys. New York: Da Capo Press. ISBN 0306806479.
- Granata, Charles L. (2003). Wouldn't it Be Nice: Brian Wilson and the Making of the Beach Boys' Pet Sounds. Chicago Review Press. ISBN 978-1-55652-507-0.
- Howard, David N. (2004). Sonic Alchemy: Visionary Music Producers and Their Maverick Recordings (1st ed.). Milwaukee, Wisconsin: Hal Leonard. ISBN 9780634055607.
- Jackson, Andrew Grant (2015). 1965: The Most Revolutionary Year in Music. St. Martin's Publishing Group. ISBN 978-1-4668-6497-9.
- Kent, Nick (2009). "The Last Beach Movie Revisited: The Life of Brian Wilson". The Dark Stuff: Selected Writings on Rock Music. Da Capo Press. ISBN 9780786730742.
- Lambert, Philip (2007). Inside the Music of Brian Wilson: the Songs, Sounds, and Influences of the Beach Boys' Founding Genius. Continuum. ISBN 978-0-8264-1876-0.
- Lambert, Phillip, ed. (2016). Good Vibrations: Brian Wilson and the Beach Boys in Critical Perspective. University of Michigan Press. doi:10.3998/mpub.9275965. ISBN 978-0-472-11995-0.
- Love, Mike (2016). Good Vibrations: My Life as a Beach Boy. Penguin Publishing Group. ISBN 978-0-698-40886-9.
- O'Regan, Jadey (2014). When I Grow Up: The Development of the Beach Boys' Sound (1962-1966) (PDF) (Thesis). Queensland Conservatorium. doi:10.25904/1912/2556.
- Perone, James E. (2015). "The Beach Boys". In Moskowitz, David V. (ed.). The 100 Greatest Bands of All Time: A Guide to the Legends Who Rocked the World. ABC-CLIO. ISBN 978-1-4408-0340-6.
- Schinder, Scott (2007). "The Beach Boys". In Schinder, Scott; Schwartz, Andy (eds.). Icons of Rock: An Encyclopedia of the Legends Who Changed Music Forever. Greenwood Press. ISBN 978-0313338458.
- Stanley, Bob (2013). Yeah Yeah Yeah: The Story of Modern Pop. Faber & Faber. ISBN 978-0-571-28198-5.
- Wilson, Brian; Greenman, Ben (2016). I Am Brian Wilson: A Memoir. Da Capo Press. ISBN 978-0-306-82307-7.
