= Help Me, Rhonda =

1965 single by the Beach Boys

"Help Me, Ronda"

Song by the Beach Boys

from the album The Beach Boys Today!
- Released: March 8, 1965
- Recorded: January 8, 1965
- Genre: Rock
- Length: 3:10
- Label: Capitol
- Composer: Brian Wilson
- Lyricists: Brian Wilson; Mike Love
- Producer: Brian Wilson

Audio sample
- file; help

"Help Me, Rhonda"
- U.S. picture sleeve

Single by the Beach Boys

from the album Summer Days (And Summer Nights!!)
- B-side: "Kiss Me, Baby"
- Released: April 5, 1965
- Recorded: February 24, 1965
- Genre: Rock
- Length: 2:46
- Label: Capitol
- Songwriters: Brian Wilson; Mike Love
- Producer: Brian Wilson

The Beach Boys singles chronology
"Do You Wanna Dance?" (1965)	"Help Me, Rhonda" (1965)	"California Girls" (1965)

Audio sample
- file; help

"Help Me, Rhonda" is a song by the American rock band the Beach Boys, appearing first on their 1965 album The Beach Boys Today! (where it was spelled "Help Me, Ronda") and subsequently in re-recorded form on the following 1965 album Summer Days (And Summer Nights!!). It was written by Brian Wilson, with additional lyrics by Mike Love. Band member Al Jardine sings the lead vocal, a rarity for this era in the Beach Boys.

According to Wilson, "Help Me, Rhonda" was not based on a real person. After it was released as an album track on Today!, Wilson revisited the song, feeling it had commercial potential. This new version, featuring a different arrangement and slightly different lyrics, was released as a single in April 1965 and appeared on Summer Days later that same year. It topped the Billboard Hot 100, making it their second number-one single following "I Get Around" (1964). It remains one of the band's most acclaimed singles commercially and critically.

== Background ==
"Help Me, Rhonda" was written by Brian Wilson with additional lyrics by Mike Love. In his memoir, Wilson claimed the song was inspired by Bobby Darin's "Mack the Knife", which he was playing on the piano when he came up with the music for "Help Me Rhonda". (Note: In a later memoir, however, he claimed to first write the music on bass and came back to complete the song on the piano.) He has also cited "Fannie Mae" as an inspiration.

The lyrics tell a story of a man who was attracted to a woman who then found another man; to aid the healing process, he begs a woman named Rhonda to help him get over her. According to Brian Wilson, "Rhonda" was not based on a real person. The song's lead vocalist Al Jardine confirmed that Wilson had told him the song was fictional, though he commented, "I'm sure there was something down there in the psychology of it. ... We didn't really get into the meaning of the lyrics. They spoke for themselves."

Mike Love cited the song as one where "maybe he [Brian Wilson] had a chorus idea" and Love would "come up with the lyrics to help finish off and complete the song." (Note: Love's lyrical contributions to "Help Me, Rhonda" were originally uncredited, but, following a 1994 lawsuit by Love, he was retroactively awarding songwriting credit to the song, among others.) Of the lyrics, Love joked, "There are a lot of people, a lot of girls named Rhonda out there who have gotten remarks related to that song all their lives."

== Recording ==
Though Brian Wilson initially intended to perform the lead vocal for the song himself, he instead assigned the part to Al Jardine. Brian Wilson later stated, "I'd heard Al sing a lot and liked his voice and wanted to write a song for him that showed off the quality of his voice and sure enough I did." Jardine, who had only sung one lead vocal for the band up to that point, (Note: Jardine's sole lead vocal before "Help Me, Rhonda" was on the song "Christmas Day", which appeared on the band's 1964 christmas album.) struggled with his vocal, recalling,

I did have a hard time with it. I don't really know. Some kind of meter thing in there. I never really tackled a lead much before. I was always interested in the backgrounds. Carl [Wilson] and I were always on the harmonies, but to take a lead was a big leap forward. And this was not an easy lead, to be honest with you. It was pretty different. I was happy that Brian asked me to sing the lead. Brian had this idea of how he wanted it and I had an idea of how I heard it, and that's basically what you get [laughs].

According to Jardine, he and Brian Wilson conflicted over Jardine's delivery of the lyric "Rhonda, you look so fine". Jardine explained, "I think the part that was hard was the length of 'fine', that was the part, to be specific with you. It could have been sung quicker or longer, and I just heard it longer and he heard it shorter. I think it kind of came out halfway in between [laughs]."

The vocal overdub session for the second version of this song was notable for resulting in a particularly heated confrontation between Wilson and his father Murry, who at the time had been dismissed as the group's manager for nearly a year but was still present in the studio on occasion. After Murry (while inebriated) continually critiqued and ridiculed the group's singing throughout each take, Brian complained and got into a tense argument which ultimately led to a physical altercation over control of the soundboard. The unedited session tape has been extensively copied and shared.

== Release ==
Two versions of "Help Me, Rhonda" were released commercially in 1965. The first version, recorded in January 1965 and featuring a ukulele-driven arrangement, was included on the band's The Beach Boys Today! album under the title "Help Me, Ronda". Jardine characterized this version as "more of a laid-back shuffle" and said it "definitely wasn't a single." Mike Love similarly recalled that he "didn't anticipate" the song would become a "breakout hit". Brian Wilson, however, felt the song had hit potential and the band rerecorded the track in 1965 with a punchier, guitar-led arrangement and some minor lyrical tweaks.

Released as a single in April 1965, the "Help Me, Rhonda" rerecording was a commercial smash hit, reaching number one in the US and knocking the Beatles' "Ticket to Ride" from the top spot. It was the band's second number one and the first since 1964's "I Get Around". In the aftermath of its chart success, the new track was then included on the band's next studio album, Summer Days (And Summer Nights!!). (Note: Bruce Johnston, who had recently been recruited by the band, claimed to have suggested to Brian that, since it was a new recording, the single version should be included on the Summer Days album.) Brian Wilson recalled, "That was one of the hits that Capitol wanted."

The song would also appear on several compilation albums, among them 1967's Best of the Beach Boys Vol. 2 and 1974's Endless Summer, with the latter featuring the original recording from the Today! album.

== Critical reception ==
Upon release, Billboard described the single version as "an intriguing off-beat rouser" which "can't miss." Cash Box described it as "a power-packed hard-driving romantic surfin’-rocker with an extremely infectious danceable back-beat." Record World said it "should be big b. o." although it "has less of their surf sound than usual, by the way." Wilson later said of the song, "I would've made a better rhythm — it wasn't in the pocket."

"Help Me, Rhonda" continues to attract critical acclaim. Writers from Paste Magazine and The Guardian included the song on their lists of the best Beach Boys songs, with the former publication calling the song Brian Wilson's "finest pre-Pet Sounds track." (Note: Paste ranked it at number four on their list, while The Guardian ranked it at number 31.) In a retrospective review, William Ruhlmann of AllMusic said of the song, "It remains one of the best examples of [Brian] Wilson's ability to turn the turmoil of his life into stirring music."

== Personnel ==
=== Today! version ===
Per Craig Slowinski.

The Beach Boys

- Al Jardine – lead vocals
- Mike Love – harmony and backing vocals
- Brian Wilson – harmony and backing vocals
- Carl Wilson – harmony and backing vocals, 12-string electric guitar
- Dennis Wilson – harmony and backing vocals

Additional musicians and production staff

- Bill Pitman – electric guitar
- Glen Campbell – 12-string acoustic guitar
- Billy Strange – ukulele
- Ray Pohlman – bass guitar
- Leon Russell – grand piano
- Hal Blaine – drums, timbales
- Julius Wechter – claves
- Billy Lee Riley – double-reed harmonica
- Steve Douglas – tenor saxophone
- Plas Johnson – tenor saxophone
- Jay Migliori – baritone saxophone
- Chuck Britz – engineer
- unknown – tambourine (possibly Ron Swallow)

=== Summer Days version ===
Per Craig Slowinski.

The Beach Boys

- Al Jardine – lead vocals
- Mike Love – harmony and backing vocals
- Brian Wilson – harmony and backing vocals, upright piano, Hammond B-3 organ
- Carl Wilson – harmony and backing vocals, 12-string guitar
- Dennis Wilson – harmony and backing vocals, tambourine

Additional musicians and production staff

- Billy Strange – 12-string guitar
- Glen Campbell – electric guitar
- Barney Kessel – ukulele
- Carol Kaye – bass guitar
- Larry Knechtel – Wurlitzer electronic piano
- Don Randi – grand piano
- Hal Blaine – drums, timbales
- Steve Douglas – tenor saxophone
- Plas Johnson – tenor saxophone
- Jay Migliori – baritone saxophone
- Chuck Britz – engineer

== Charts ==
Weekly charts
Chart (1965)	Peak position
Australia (Kent Music Report)	10
Canada Top Singles (RPM)	1
Sweden (Swedish Radio 3)	5
UK Record Retailer	27
US Billboard Hot 100	1

Year-end charts
Chart (1965)	Position
US Billboard Hot 100	11

== Certifications ==
Certifications for "Help Me, Rhonda"
Region	Certification	Certified units/sales
United States (RIAA)	Gold	500,000^{‡}
^{^} Shipments figures based on certification alone.^{‡} Sales+streaming figures based on certification alone.

== List of later versions ==
- 1970 – Roy Orbison, The Big O.
- 1975 – Johnny Rivers, New Lovers And Old Friends (with an assist from Brian Wilson on back-up vocals); reached #22 on the Billboard Hot 100.
- 1999 - Pastor Troy, We Ready I Declare War.
- 2010 - Al Jardine re-recorded the song with Steve Miller and Flea for his 2010 album, A Postcard from California.
