= Bull Session with the "Big Daddy" =

"Bull Session with the 'Big Daddy'"

Song by the Beach Boys

from the album The Beach Boys Today!
- Released: March 8, 1965
- Genre: Interview
- Length: 2:10
- Label: Capitol
- Producer: Brian Wilson

"Bull Session with the 'Big Daddy'" is a recording by the American rock band the Beach Boys that closes their album The Beach Boys Today!, released in 1965. The track is one of the few non-musical tracks released on the band's studio albums, the others being "'Cassius' Love vs. 'Sonny' Wilson" from Shut Down Volume 2 and "Our Favorite Recording Sessions" from All Summer Long.

== Background ==
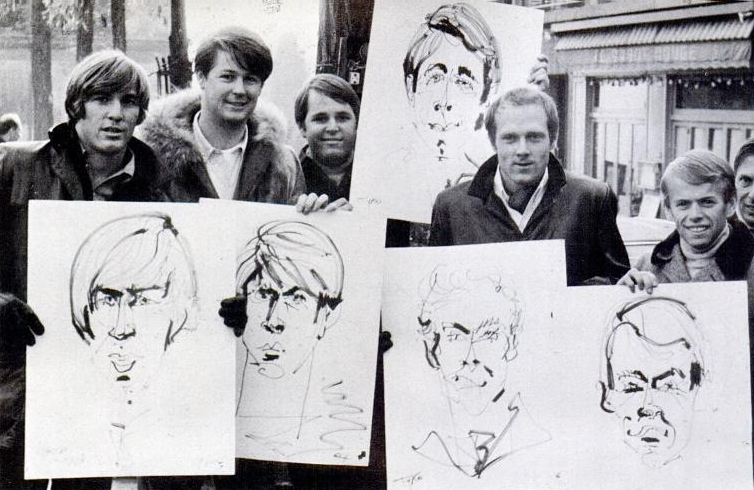
The Beach Boys in Europe, late 1964.

The track is a recording of an informal interview of the Beach Boys by Earl Leaf. Al Jardine is not present during the interview, although the other four members are; also present is Brian Wilson's wife, Marilyn. Its runtime, which is 2 minutes and 10 seconds long, is only an excerpt from the interview which lasts 20 minutes and 12 seconds.

Mike Love commented in a 2022 interview,

"Bull Session with 'Big Daddy'" is pretty silly. It's just a bunch of young guys experiencing a lot of success, and we're just relieving stress, not concentrating on releasing a hit, but just having a little bit of fun in the studio. It may have occurred to us, this will be enough to complete an album that if we record this, we can turn the album in, but I think it was just a way to lighten the mood.

== Reception ==
Scott Interrante of PopMatters described "Bull Session with 'Big Daddy'" as a "filler chatter track" and said that "over the two minutes, very little of substance is said, and one seriously questions why it was included at all", concluding that "I think we can all agree that the album would be better off without it". Author Andrew Hickey described the track as "the most pointless thing in the band's discography". Writer Keith Badman called the track "bizarre".
