= The Beach Boys' Christmas Album =

Studio album by the Beach Boys
- Released: November 9, 1964
- Recorded: October 20, 1963 ("Little Saint Nick"); June 18–30, 1964
- Studio: Capitol and Western, Hollywood
- Genre: Christmas
- Length: 27:37
- Label: Capitol
- Producer: Brian Wilson

The Beach Boys chronology
Beach Boys Concert (1964)	The Beach Boys' Christmas Album (1964)	The Beach Boys Today! (1965)

The Beach Boys UK chronology
Shut Down Volume 2 (1964)	The Beach Boys' Christmas Album (1964)	Beach Boys Concert (1965)

Singles from The Beach Boys' Christmas Album
- 1. "The Man with All the Toys" / "Blue Christmas" Released: November 9, 1964

The Beach Boys' Christmas Album is the seventh studio album by the American rock band the Beach Boys, released November 9, 1964 on Capitol Records. It contains five original songs and seven standards on a Christmas theme. The album proved to be a long-running success during subsequent Christmas seasons, initially reaching No. 6 on Billboard's Christmas LP's chart in its initial release and eventually going gold. Music historian James Perone wrote that it is "regarded as one of the finest holiday albums of the rock era".

While leader Brian Wilson produced and arranged the rock songs, he left it to Dick Reynolds (an arranger for the Four Freshmen, a group Wilson idolized) to arrange the 41-piece orchestral backings on the traditional songs to which the Beach Boys would apply their vocals. One single was released from the album, the original song "The Man with All the Toys" backed with the group's rendition of "Blue Christmas". "Little Saint Nick", a single which had already been released the previous year, was included on the album.

In 1977, the Beach Boys attempted to follow the album with Merry Christmas from the Beach Boys, but it was rejected by their label. The entire Christmas Album plus selections from the Merry Christmas sessions were later assembled for the 1998 compilation Ultimate Christmas.

The original Capitol CD reissue contains a remix of "Little Saint Nick" (the single version) instead of the original album version.

== Background ==
The album was devised as a response to Phil Spector's A Christmas Gift for You from Philles Records (1963), an album Brian had attended recording sessions for. He played piano on the song "Santa Claus Is Coming to Town" but was dismissed by Spector due to his "substandard" piano playing. Side one consists mostly of original Christmas-themed rock songs penned by Brian Wilson and Mike Love, while side two features both secular and religious Christmas standards with orchestral accompaniments and conducting by Dick Reynolds. Original album cover photo by George Jerman for Capitol Photo Studio.

== Recording ==
With the exception of "Little Saint Nick", sessions for the album spanned June 18–30, 1964, one month after the All Summer Long album was completed. "Christmas Day" is the first Beach Boys song to feature a lead vocal from Al Jardine.

The album was released in mono and stereo; the stereo mix, prepared by engineer Chuck Britz, would be the last true stereo mix for a Beach Boys album until 1968's Friends.

In addition to orchestral renditions of "Jingle Bells" and the original Wilson composition "Christmas Eve" which never received vocal overdubs, outtakes of the All Summer Long track "Little Honda" and The Beach Boys Today! song "Don't Hurt My Little Sister" were recorded in between June sessions.

== Reception ==
Professional ratings
Review scores
Source	Rating
AllMusic	4/5 stars
Encyclopedia of Popular Music	3/5 stars
The Rolling Stone Album Guide	2/5 stars

In a retrospective review, AllMusic's Jason Ankeny stated: "Brian Wilson's pop genius is well suited to classic Yuletide fare, and the group delivers lush performances of standards ranging from 'Frosty the Snowman' to 'White Christmas' as well as more contemporary material like 'The Man With All the Toys' and 'Blue Christmas.'"

While interviewing Wilson for a promotional radio special in 1964, Jack Wagner remarked that Wilson's decision to sing solo on a version of "Blue Christmas" could be "the start of a whole new career," to which Wilson responded "I don’t know. It could and it couldn't. I really don’t know." Referring to the standards which he believed "proved that the Beach Boys' vocal power was bigger and more agile than the surf and hot rod records [and] staking a claim for wider musical terrain," author Luis Sanchez reflected: "The Beach Boys' Christmas Album music shows a quality of aesthetic selectivity that none of the group's records that came before it do, aspiring not just to assimilate one of pop's stock ideas, but also enabling Brian to make one of his biggest artistic advances."

On April 6, 1982, the album was certified gold by the RIAA, selling more than 500,000 units.

== Ultimate Christmas ==
Released in 1998, Ultimate Christmas is a compilation containing all of the twelve tracks from the original Christmas LP in stereo. Many bonus tracks were added, including the 1974 single "Child of Winter" and several previously unreleased tracks from the aborted 1977 album Merry Christmas from the Beach Boys.

== Track listing ==
Mike Love's writing credits on the tracks marked with a (*) were only awarded after a 1994 court case.

Side one
No.	Title	Writer(s)	Lead vocals	Length
1.	"Little Saint Nick" (*)	Brian Wilson; Mike Love	Love	1:59
2.	"The Man with All the Toys" (*)	B. Wilson; Love	Love; B. Wilson	1:32
3.	"Santa's Beard" (*)	B. Wilson; Love	Love	1:59
4.	"Merry Christmas, Baby" (*)	B. Wilson; Love	Love	2:22
5.	"Christmas Day"	B. Wilson	Al Jardine	1:35
6.	"Frosty the Snowman"	Walter Rollins; Steve Nelson	B. Wilson	1:54

Side two
No.	Title	Writer(s)	Lead vocals	Length
1.	"We Three Kings of Orient Are"	John Henry Hopkins Jr.	The Beach Boys	4:03
2.	"Blue Christmas"	Billy Hayes; Jay W. Johnson	B. Wilson	3:09
3.	"Santa Claus Is Comin' to Town"	John Frederick Coots; Haven Gillespie	B. Wilson; Love	2:20
4.	"White Christmas"	Irving Berlin	B. Wilson	2:29
5.	"I'll Be Home for Christmas"	Kim Gannon; Walter Kent; Buck Ram	B. Wilson	2:44
6.	"Auld Lang Syne"	Traditional, arranged by B. Wilson	The Beach Boys; Dennis Wilson (spoken word)	1:19
Total length:				27:37

1991 CD reissue bonus tracks
No.	Title	Writer(s)	Lead Vocals	Length
13.	"Little Saint Nick" (mono) (*)	B. Wilson; Love	Love	2:01
14.	"The Lord's Prayer" (B-side of the single version of "Little Saint Nick")	Traditional, arranged by B. Wilson	The Beach Boys	2:34
15.	"Little Saint Nick" (alternate take, mono) (*)	B. Wilson; Love	Love	1:56
16.	"Auld Lang Syne" (alternate take)	Traditional, arranged by B. Wilson	The Beach Boys	1:19
Total length:				35:27

== Personnel ==
Partial credits courtesy of session archivist Craig Slowinski.

The Beach Boys

- Al Jardine – vocals, rhythm guitar
- Mike Love – vocals
- Brian Wilson – vocals, bass, keyboards
- Carl Wilson – vocals, lead guitar, keyboards
- Dennis Wilson – vocals, drums, percussion
- David Marks – vocals, rhythm guitar on "Little Saint Nick" (both credits uncertain)

Additional musicians and technical staff

- Al Viola – guitar
- Cliff Hils – double bass
- Gene DiNovi, Jimmy Rowles – grand piano
- Frank Capp, Jack Sperling – drums
- Eddie Rosa, Gene Cipriano, William Green, Willie Schwartz, Robert Jung – flute and/or saxophone
- Chuck Gentry – bass clarinet and/or baritone saxophone
- William Hinshaw, Arthur Maebe, Richard Perissi, Arthur Briegleb, David Duke – French horns
- Henry Laubach, Ollie Mitchell, Al Porcino, Virgil Evans, John Audino, Conrad Gozzo, Raymond Triscari – trumpets
- Harry Betts, Francis Howard, George Roberts, Urbie Green, Lew McCreary, Dick Nash – trombones
- Red Callender – tuba
- James Getzoff, Robert Barene, Arnold Belnick, Bernard Kundell, Paul Shure, Harry Bluestone, Henry Roth, Alfred Lustgarten, William Kurasch, Lou Raderman, Marshall Sosson, Darrel Terwilliger - violins
- Edgar Lustgarten, Jesse Ehrlich, Ray Kelley, Karl Rossner, Frederick Seykora, Nathan Gershman, Alfred Wohl, Margaret Aue, Armand Kaproff, Joseph Saxon – cellos
- Dorothy Remsen - harp
- Benjamin Barrett – orchestra master
- Dick Reynolds – orchestra conductor/arranger
- Mainerd Baker, George Yocum – copyists
- Bill Putnam – engineer – orchestral tracks
- Chuck Britz – engineer
- Mark Linett – remix engineer (1991)

== Charts ==
Chart performance for The Beach Boys' Christmas Album
Chart (1964)	Peak position
US Christmas LP's (Billboard)	6

Chart (2019–2023)	Peak position
Canadian Albums (Billboard)	35
US Billboard 200	66
US Top Catalog Albums (Billboard)	35
US Top Holiday Albums (Billboard)	23
