= In the Back of My Mind =

1965 song by the Beach Boys

Song by the Beach Boys

from the album The Beach Boys Today!
- Released: March 8, 1965
- Recorded: January 13–19, 1965
- Studio: Western, Hollywood
- Length: 2:09 (mono); 2:11 (stereo)
- Label: Capitol
- Composer: Brian Wilson
- Lyricists: Brian Wilson; Mike Love
- Producer: Brian Wilson

Audio sample
- file; help

"In the Back of My Mind" is a song by the American rock band the Beach Boys from their 1965 album The Beach Boys Today!. Written by Brian Wilson and Mike Love, it is a heavily orchestrated ballad composed in 6/8 time. Dennis Wilson largely sings lead solo though briefly during the middle eight, his brothers Brian and Carl sing two lines in unison.

Fans and critics regard the song as one of the band's "masterpieces". It is one of the group's songs that most heavily draw from the Tin Pan Alley style of songwriting, while the chord patterns were virtually unprecedented in Brian's music at the time. The song ends with a breakdown of its instruments playing out of sync from each other.

== Overview ==
"In the Back of My Mind" is about someone who describes themselves as "blessed with everything", yet has unfounded suspicions that his happy relationship will someday disintegrate. Wilson wrote in his 2016 memoir that the melody was inspired by the Skyliners' "Since I Don't Have You". It is one of the group's songs that most heavily draw from the Tin Pan Alley style of songwriting, and in musicologist Phillip Lambert's assessment, the chord patterns "are virtually unprecedented in Brian's work."

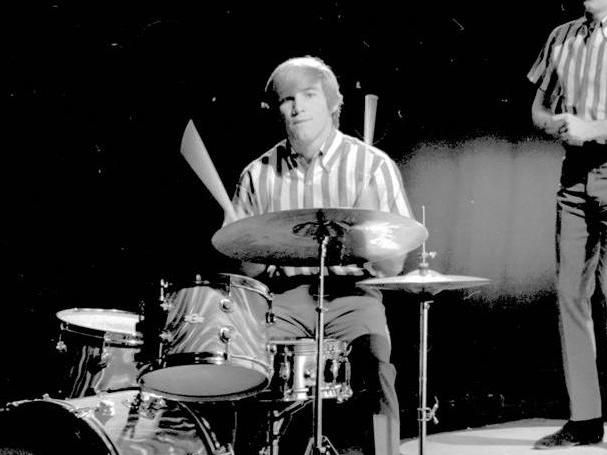
Drummer Dennis Wilson sang the lead vocal

It is a heavily orchestrated ballad, composed in 6/8 time, with Dennis Wilson singing lead. The arrangement lacks a groove and a traditional drum set. Instead, the rhythm is provided by acoustic guitars, vibraphone, and a Wurlitzer electric piano. There are also no vocal harmonies. In the bridge, pizzicato strings underscore a passage in which the narrator expresses, "I try to run far away from thoughts I shouldn't try to keep away, but they just keep coming back to me". His brothers Brian and Carl sing in unison during this section. In his book Yeah Yeah Yeah: The Story of Modern Pop, Bob Stanley remarked that the narrator's "emotions, whatever really was in the back of his mind, seemed to come out without any filter for what was deemed cool, or appropriate, or even musically acceptable".

The song ends with a breakdown of its instruments playing out of sync from each other. Biographer Peter Ames Carlin commented, "It's like the orchestra is falling apart. It's about the guy's wife, and that's the most intimate relationship you can have. It radiates the complexities in Brian's inner life and how that comes through in his music and how he expresses that in music." Music historian Charles Granata described the track as "disturbing" and "the antithesis of any prescribed commercial formula—a curious experiment marking an extreme deviation from the band." Howard similarly regarded its "stony lead vocal" and "warped string arrangement" as Wilson's "most ambitious arrangement to date."

== Recording ==
"In the Back of My Mind" was recorded over two dates at Western Studios, both produced, arranged and conducted by Brian Wilson. 40 takes of the instrumental track were recorded on January 13, 1965, with the 39th being deemed the master. The vocals were overdubbed at a session on January 19, 1965. In a 1995 interview, Brian voiced dissatisfaction with Dennis' vocal, saying that it was not doubletracked well.

== Legacy and recognition ==
Fans and critics regard "In the Back of My Mind" as one of the band's "masterpieces". Peter Doggett said of Dennis' performance, "he showed for the first time an awareness that his voice could be a blunt emotional instrument. ... his erratic croon cut straight to the heart, with an urgency that his more precise brothers could never have matched." In his review for AllMusic, Matthew Greenwald offered praise of the song and its lyrics, saying that the choice of lead singer was good and that Dennis' performance is "wonderfully fragile." Biographer David Leaf wrote, "Dennis’ soulful lead vocals helps bring out the jazzy feel of a song that is really unique in the Brian Wilson catalogue. The lush yet subtle orchestration (listen to the oboe) and percussion on this track hinted at what was to come on Pet Sounds."

== 1975 version ==
In 1975, Brian recorded a demo version of the song with himself on lead vocals and additional lyrics. It was released as a bonus track on the deluxe edition of his 2015 solo album No Pier Pressure.

== Personnel ==
Per band archivist Craig Slowinski.

The Beach Boys

- Brian Wilson – backing vocals; arranger, producer, conductor
- Carl Wilson – backing vocals; twelve-string lead guitar
- Dennis Wilson – lead vocals, double-tracked vocals

Session musicians and production staff

- Hal Blaine – temple block, timbale
- Chuck Britz – engineer
- Peter Christ – oboe or english horn (uncertain)
- Steve Douglas – tenor saxophone
- Plas Johnson – tenor saxophone
- Jay Migliori – baritone saxophone
- Carol Kaye – bass guitar
- Bill Pitman – acoustic guitar
- Don Randi – Hammond B-3 organ
- Billy Riley – double–reed harmonica (uncertain)
- Leon Russell – Wurlitzer electric piano
- Billy Strange – electric rhythm guitar
- Tommy Tedesco – autoharp
- Julius Wechter - vibraphone
