= When I Grow Up (To Be a Man) =

- U.S. picture sleeve

Single by the Beach Boys

from the album The Beach Boys Today!
- B-side: "She Knows Me Too Well"
- Released: August 24, 1964
- Recorded: August 5–10, 1964
- Studio: Western, Hollywood
- Genre: Rock and roll
- Length: 2:01
- Label: Capitol
- Composer: Brian Wilson
- Lyricists: Brian Wilson; Mike Love
- Producer: Brian Wilson

The Beach Boys singles chronology
"I Get Around" (1964)	"When I Grow Up (To Be a Man)" (1964)	"Dance, Dance, Dance" (1964)

"When I Grow Up (To Be a Man)" is a song by the American rock band the Beach Boys from their 1965 album The Beach Boys Today!. Written by Brian Wilson and Mike Love, it was first issued as a single on August 24, 1964, paired with the B-side "She Knows Me Too Well". It peaked at number 9 in the U.S., number 27 in the UK, and number 1 in Canada.

The lyrics describe a boy who is feeling anxious about his own future when he will no longer be a teenager, pondering such questions as "Will I love my wife for the rest of my life?" It is possibly the earliest U.S. top 40 song to contain the expression "turn on", and is one of the earliest rock songs to cover the topic of impending adulthood. Musically, the song has been highlighted for its jazz influence and unique arrangement and harmonic structure.

== Background and inspiration ==
"When I Grow Up (To Be a Man)" was composed by Brian Wilson with lyrics by both him and his cousin and frequent writing partner Mike Love. At the time, Brian told the Birmingham Post, "When I was younger, I used to worry about turning into an old square over the years. I don't think I will now, and that is what inspired 'When I Grow Up'." In a 2011 interview, he commented that when he wrote the song, he had a dismal view of his future, saying "'When I Grow Up (To Be A Man)’ was inspired about what it was gonna be like to grow up. Will I like the things then as I did now? I wrote that in my early twenties. As I look back on that I am happy with my life now and I didn't think I would be.” In his 2016 memoir, Love wrote that the song was "probably influenced" by Murry Wilson, who constantly challenged Brian's manhood. (Note: Wilson later revisited the topic of manhood in 1966, for the Smile song "Child Is Father of the Man".)

== Lyrics ==
"When I Grow Up (To Be a Man)" is one of the first rock songs to discuss impending adulthood. It is also possibly the earliest U.S. top 40 song to contain the expression "turn on" (from the lyric "will I dig the same things that turned me on as a kid?"). (Note: This expression would later become emblematic of the late 1960s counterculture movement, particularly as part of the phrase "Turn on, tune in, drop out", popularized by Timothy Leary.)

The lyrics describe a boy who is anxious of when he stops being a teenager. To this effect, the narrator poses such questions as "Will I love my wife for the rest of my life?" That line in particular marked the first instance of a Beach Boys song discussing falling out of love with someone, as opposed to just being in or out of a relationship. Academic Jody O'Regan interpreted the line as Wilson admitting that he had had doubts about his marriage. Journalist Alice Bolin commented, "'When I Grow Up to Be a Man' is about envisioning the past. It was written by a 23-year-old who imagined a 13-year-old imagining what it was like to be 23."

== Composition ==
"When I Grow Up" features multiple key changes, a hook based on a dissonant, functionally ambiguous chord, tempo stretches, and a long pause as a climax. Music historian Charles Granata wrote that the song "best exemplifies the [band's] musical growth" through its "effective combination of odd sounds" and its "full and round" vocal harmonies. O'Regan brought special attention to the drum pattern for avoiding a traditional backbeat rhythm common to rock and roll songs of this era. Instead, it "effectively plays 'around' the vocals with interesting fills adding texture and drama to the passing of time in the lyrics. Each part of the drum kit works independently from each other, horizontally as four separate parts, rather than a whole set working together."

A prominent element of the song's composition is its use of jazz harmony. The chord that opens the song and repeats each chorus is traditionally notated as an G♭^{9(#11)} chord. In his book Inside the Music of Brian Wilson, Lambert writes that this unusual chord "grabs our attention immediately." and interprets that it represents the "swirl of complications arising from the growth into adulthood described in the song’s lyric". According to Lambert, "As the song progresses, we realize that Brian is associating the dissonance of the initial chord, along with the vocal counterpoint at the end of the verse and the advanced chord progression of the wordless bridge, with a more “mature” attitude and life perspective."

== Recording ==
The track was recorded over two sessions in 1964 at Western Studio. The instrumental track was recorded on August 5 with a basic line-up of Brian on piano, Carl on guitar, Al Jardine on bass, and Dennis on drums. On this same day, the band recorded the backing track for "She Knows Me Too Well", ultimately selected as the single's B-side. It took 37 takes to record, as the band members struggled with the complicated rhythm of the song, particularly Dennis, who frequently caused takes to end prematurely due to playing mistakes. Band archivist Craig Slowinski notes that Brian was very demanding during these sessions, prompting Carl to comment about how hard "Brian rides [Dennis]" in the studio. Following the successful master take of the basic backing track, overdubs were recorded, including fills on the harpsichord played by Brian, a guitar solo by Carl, and a double-reed harmonica part performed by Carroll Lewis, the only non-Beach Boy to appear on the record.

The vocals were overdubbed later on August 10, this time with lead singer Love joining the sessions for the first time. At this stage, "When I Grow Up (To Be a Man)" was not yet slated to be the Beach Boys' next single, rather it was only planned as an album track. Vocal overdubs took 14 takes to complete. Brian Wilson later expressed disappointment with his vocal part, saying that the group were trying to sound like the Four Freshmen, but his voice was too "whiney" on the song.

== Release ==
On August 24, 1964, "When I Grow Up (To Be a Man)" was issued as a single, backed with "She Knows Me Too Well", and peaked at number 9 in the US. It also spent two weeks at number one in Canada's national RPM chart, their second chart-topper following "I Get Around".

In the UK, the single was issued on October 23. During the band's first British tour in November 1964, they performed this song for their first television appearances in Britain, on Discs a Go Go, The Beat Room, Top Gear, and Ready Steady Go!. Ultimately, the single peaked at number 27 in the UK. The group would not return to the Top 10 in the UK until 1966.

In March 1965, "When I Grow Up (To Be a Man)" was issued on the album The Beach Boys Today!, sequenced as the fourth track on Side 1, appearing alongside its B-side "She Knows Me Too Well", as well as fellow recent Beach Boys singles "Do You Wanna Dance?", "Please Let Me Wonder" and "Dance, Dance, Dance".

"When I Grow Up (To Be a Man)" has appeared on several greatest hits collections of the Beach Boys music, particularly those focusing on their earlier material, such as Best of the Beach Boys Vol. 2, Spirit of America, and Sounds of Summer: The Very Best of The Beach Boys. An a cappella mix of the song was released in 2014 on the compilation album Keep an Eye on Summer – The Beach Boys Sessions 1964.

The "won't last forever" refrain in "When I Grow Up (To Be A Man)" is reprised on the track "Winds Of Change" from the Beach Boys' 1978 album MIU Album.

== Reception ==
Upon its initial release, Cash Box described it as being in "jumpin' rhythmic manner that has made [the Beach Boys] such big teen favorites."

Critic Richard Meltzer cited "When I Grow Up" as the moment when the Beach Boys "abruptly ceased to be boys". Writing for AllMusic, Matthew Greenwald praised the song for its harpsichord-based arrangement and for being one of the first of Wilson's compositions to speak to his psychological concerns, describing it as "Certainly one of the most important transitional-period Brian Wilson songs". Music theorist Daniel Harrison described it as among the many "glimmerings of change" featured on The Beach Boys Today and Summer Days (and Summer Nights!!), specifically noting its "harmonic and formal innovations". Harrison also compares it to its B-side "She Knows Me Too Well", nothing that both feature "complex lyrical expressions" of "un-fun topics".

In a list ranking the Beach Boys' 50 greatest songs, Mojo magazine placed it 39th, describing it as "an ode to youth's fleeting nature." Music journalist Bruce Pollock listed the song as one of the greatest of the decade in his book Rock Song Index: The 7500 Most Important Songs for the Rock and Roll Era: 1944–2000.

== Personnel ==
Surviving sessions audio and AFM musician contracts sheets, documented by Craig Slowinski have enabled this personnel list to be compiled.

The Beach Boys

- Al Jardine – electric bass guitar, second tenor/baritone harmony and background vocals
- Mike Love – lead vocals, bass harmony and background vocals
- Brian Wilson – acoustic upright piano, Baldwin electric harpsichord, lead vocals, first tenor/falsetto harmony and background vocals
- Carl Wilson – electric lead and rhythm guitars, second tenor harmony and background vocals
- Dennis Wilson – drums, hi-hat, baritone harmony and background vocals

Session musician

- Carrol Lewis – double-reed harmonica

== Charts ==
Chart (1964)	Peak position
Canadian RPM Singles Chart	1
UK Singles Chart	27
U.S. Billboard Hot 100	9
U.S. Cash Box Top 100	7

== Bibliography ==
- Badman, Keith (2004). The Beach Boys: The Definitive Diary of America's Greatest Band, on Stage and in the Studio. Backbeat Books. ISBN 978-0-87930-818-6.
- Harrison, Daniel (1997). "After Sundown: The Beach Boys' Experimental Music" (PDF). In Covach, John; Boone, Graeme M. (eds.). Understanding Rock: Essays in Musical Analysis. Oxford University Press. pp. 33–57. ISBN 978-0-19-988012-6.
- Granata, Charles L. (2003). Wouldn't it Be Nice: Brian Wilson and the Making of the Beach Boys' Pet Sounds. Chicago Review Press. ISBN 978-1-55652-507-0.
- Lambert, Phillip, ed. (2016). Good Vibrations: Brian Wilson and the Beach Boys in Critical Perspective. University of Michigan Press. doi:10.3998/mpub.9275965. ISBN 978-0-472-11995-0.
- Love, Mike (2016). Good Vibrations: My Life as a Beach Boy. Penguin Publishing Group. ISBN 978-0-698-40886-9.
- O'Regan, Jody (2014). When I Grow Up: The Development of the Beach Boys' Sound (1962–1966) (PDF) (Thesis). Queensland Conservatorium. doi:10.25904/1912/2556.
