= Do You Want to Dance =

1958 single by Bobby Freeman

- Side A of the 1958 Canadian single

Single by Bobby Freeman

from the album Do You Wanna Dance
- B-side: "Big Fat Woman"
- Released: March 29, 1958
- Genre: Rock and roll
- Length: 2:30
- Label: Josie
- Songwriter: Bobby Freeman
- Producer: Morty Palitz

Bobby Freeman singles chronology
"Do You Want to Dance" (1958)	"Betty Lou Got a New Pair of Shoes" (1958)

"Do You Want to Dance" is a song written by American singer Bobby Freeman and recorded by him in 1958. It reached number 5 on the United States Billboard Top 100 Sides pop chart, No. 2 on the Billboard R&B chart, and number 1 in Canada. Cliff Richard and the Shadows' version of the song reached number 2 in the United Kingdom in 1962, despite being a B-side. The Beach Boys notably covered the song in 1965 for their album The Beach Boys Today!; retitled "Do You Wanna Dance?", their version reached number 12 in the United States. A 1972 cover by Bette Midler with the original title restored reached number 17.

== Bobby Freeman recording ==
San Francisco-born teenager Bobby Freeman had been a member of doo-wop groups the Romancers and the Vocaleers. When asked by a local DJ if he had written any songs, he wrote several and recorded them as solo demos. These included "Do You Want to Dance", which was heard by a visiting record label executive, Mortimer Palitz of Jubilee Records. He signed Freeman to the label, and had the original recording overdubbed in New York by session musicians including guitarist Billy Mure. Released on the Jubilee subsidiary label Josie, "Do You Want to Dance" quickly rose to number 5 on the pop chart and number 2 on the R&B chart in early 1958, when Freeman was still only 17. Contrary to some reports, Jerry Garcia did not play on the record.

The song was included in Robert Christgau's "Basic Record Library" of 1950s and 1960s recordings, published in Christgau's Record Guide: Rock Albums of the Seventies (1981).

=== Personnel ===
- Bobby Freeman - vocals, piano
- Billy Mure - guitar

=== Charts ===
Chart (1958)	Peak position
Canada (CHUM)	1
US Hot R&B Singles (Billboard)	2
US (Billboard Hot 100)	5

== Cliff Richard and the Shadows version ==
"Do You Want to Dance"
- Dutch single sleeve

Single by Cliff Richard and the Shadows
- A-side: "I'm Lookin' out the Window"
- Released: May 4, 1962
- Recorded: December 19, 1961
- Studio: EMI, London
- Genre: Rock and roll
- Length: 2:16
- Label: Columbia
- Songwriter: Bobby Freeman
- Producer: Norrie Paramor

Cliff Richard and the Shadows singles chronology
"The Young Ones" (1962)	"I'm Lookin' out the Window" / "Do You Want to Dance" (1962)	"It'll Be Me" (1962)

The Cliff Richard and the Shadows version also known as "Do You Wanna Dance" was released in the United Kingdom as the B-side of "I'm Lookin' Out the Window" in May 1962. However, like seven other Cliff Richard singles released between 1959 and 1963, the B-side received a good amount of airplay and made the New Musical Express UK singles chart in its own right. On this occasion, it became Richard's second highest charting B-side (after "Bachelor Boy"), making it to number 10 (while "I'm Lookin' Out the Window" reached number 2). The single reached number 2 on the other UK chart, the official UK Singles Chart, listing both tracks.

"Do You Want to Dance" went on to become the more successful charting track from the single in some countries, reaching number 1 in the Netherlands, Australia (based on the Sydney chart of the time, because an Australian nationwide chart had not yet started) and Flemish Belgium. The single went on to sell over 1 million copies worldwide.

"Do You Want to Dance" was included on the EP Cliff’s Hits, released November 1962, and first appeared on LP with Richard's first compilation album Cliff's Hit Album, released July 1963. A live version appeared on Richard's double album Japan Tour 74 issued in 1975.

=== Recording ===
"Do You Want to Dance" was recorded on December 19, 1961 at EMI's Abbey Road Studios. The session, engineered by Malcolm Addy and produced by EMI's A&R man Norrie Paramor, featured new drummer Brian Bennett and Jet Harris on bass, soon to leave the Shadows in 1962.

=== Charts ===
Chart entries as "Do You Want to Dance" or "Do You Want to Dance"/"I'm Looking Out the Window":

Chart (1962)	Peak position
UK (New Musical Express Chart)	10
Australia (Kent Music Report) (retrospectively calculated chart position)	3
Belgium (Ultratop 50 Flanders)	4
Belgium (Ultratop 50 Wallonia)	9
Netherlands (Single Top 100)	1
Spain (Promusicae)	15
Sweden (Tio i Topp)	1

Chart entries as "I'm Looking Out the Window"/"Do You Want to Dance":

Chart (1962)	Peak position
UK Singles (Official Charts)	2
Belgium (Ultratop 50 Wallonia)	9
Finland (Suomen virallinen lista)	18
Ireland (IRMA)	2
Norway (VG-lista)	2
Sweden (Sverigetopplistan)	3

== Del Shannon version ==
"Do You Want to Dance"
- Side A of the 1964 Canadian single

Single by Del Shannon

from the album 1,661 Seconds with Del Shannon
- B-side: "This Is All I Have to Give"
- Released: September 19, 1964
- Genre: Rock and roll
- Length: 2:36
- Label: Amy
- Songwriter: Bobby Freeman
- Producer: Harry Balk

Del Shannon singles chronology
"Handy Man" (1964)	"Do You Want to Dance" (1964)	"Keep Searchin' (We'll Follow the Sun)" (1964)

In 1964, the song was covered by Del Shannon and released by Amy Records as the lead single to his sixth studio album 1,661 Seconds with Del Shannon (1965) and produced by Harry Balk. The single was a modest success, peaking at Number 43 on the Billboard Hot 100, Number 23 on the CHUM Chart in Canada, Number 27 on the Australian Kent Music Report and Number 45 on the Cashbox chart.

=== Charts ===
Chart (1964)	Peak position
Canada (CHUM)	23
Australia (Kent Music Report)	27
US (Billboard Hot 100)	43
US (Cashbox Top 100)	45

== The Beach Boys version ==
"Do You Wanna Dance?"
- US single sleeve

Single by the Beach Boys

from the album The Beach Boys Today!
- B-side: "Please Let Me Wonder"
- Released: February 15, 1965
- Recorded: January 11, 1965
- Studio: Gold Star, Hollywood, California
- Genre: Rock and roll
- Length: 2:21
- Label: Capitol
- Songwriter: Bobby Freeman
- Producer: Brian Wilson

The Beach Boys singles chronology
"The Man with All the Toys" (1964)	"Do You Wanna Dance?" (1965)	"Help Me, Rhonda" (1965)

Audio sample
- "Do You Wanna Dance?": file; help

The Beach Boys' version of "Do You Wanna Dance?" was released as a single in February 1965, and served as the opening track to their album The Beach Boys Today! the following month. It is distinguished from the original through its lush orchestration, three-part vocal arrangement, and instrumental bridge key change. Dillon speculated that the rendition may have been inspired by the version by Del Shannon, who had recently recorded the song, although the Beach Boys' version bears a "closer resemblance" to an earlier version by Cliff Richard and the Shadows. It was the first song the group recorded at Gold Star, Spector's favorite studio, and their second song that employed a timpani. (Note: "Pom, Pom Play Girl" was the first.)

=== Recording ===
"Do You Wanna Dance?" was recorded on January 11, 1965 at Gold Star Studios and was produced, arranged and conducted by Brian Wilson. Take 3 of the song was used as the master. It was the Beach Boys' first single to feature session musicians playing most of the backing track while the group overdubbed vocals, an arrangement Wilson would maintain for the next two years. Additionally, "Do You Wanna Dance?" marked the first single released by the group following Wilson's nervous breakdown the previous year.

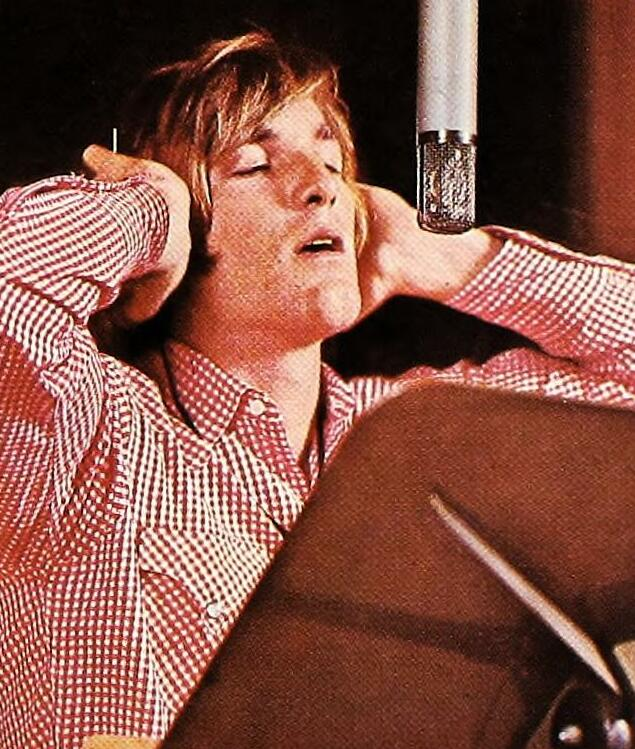
Dennis Wilson sang lead on the song, marking his first lead vocal on a Beach Boys single

The band's drummer Dennis Wilson sang lead on the song. This came at a time in the band's history when Brian began giving more leads to Dennis. On The Beach Boys Today!, Dennis sang the first and last songs of the album ("Do You Wanna Dance?" and "In the Back of My Mind"). This was because Brian had felt that Dennis "never really had a chance to sing very much", and so he gave him more leads on the album.

=== Release ===
"Do You Wanna Dance?" was released as a single through Capitol Records on February 15, 1965. It peaked at number 12 on the Billboard Hot 100 and was the highest charting Beach Boys song to feature Dennis Wilson on lead vocals. According to the contemporary United Press International (UPI) chart published by newspapers across the United States it was number eight in April 1965. It did best in regional playlists in the Twin Cities, Baltimore and San Jose, where it was number two; Dallas, Seattle and San Diego to number three; Portland to number four; and Chicago, Washington DC, Phoenix, Milwaukee, Cincinnati, Hartford, Tulsa and Lincoln, number five. The B-side of the single was "Please Let Me Wonder". The song was later released as the opening track of the group's 1965 album The Beach Boys Today!.

On February 28, the band (with Brian) appeared on the television show Shindig! performing "Do You Wanna Dance?" and a truncated version of "Please Let Me Wonder".

=== Alternate versions ===
In 2008, the Beach Boys compilation U.S. Singles Collection: The Capitol Years 1962-1965 featured an instrumental mix of "Do You Wanna Dance?" A stereo remix of the song was released in 2012 on the stereo remaster of The Beach Boys Today!. A live version recorded in March 1965 was released in 2015 for the archival live album Live in Chicago 1965.

=== Critical reception ===
Cash Box described it as having "an infectious neo-surfln’ style complete with rapidly-changing, danceable riffs."

Retrospectively, commentators have noted "Do You Wanna Dance?" as emblematic of the growing complexity in Wilson's work on The Beach Boys Today?. Musicologist Philip Lambert described "Do You Wanna Dance?" as an example of a song that "highlights the difference between ‘a song covered by the Beach Boys’ and an existing song transformed into ‘a Beach Boys song". Journalist Scott Iterrante praised "Do You Wanna Dance?" as a "sophisticated reinterpretation" by Wilson of the original song, additionally saying "Wilson proves that he can be just as harmonically and structurally inventive with catchy dance songs as he can with emotional ballads."

=== Personnel ===
Sourced from Musician's Union AFM contract sheets and surviving session audio, documented by Craig Slowinski.

The Beach Boys

- Al Jardine – harmony and backing vocals
- Mike Love – harmony and backing vocals
- Brian Wilson – harmony and backing vocals; acoustic grand piano
- Carl Wilson – harmony and backing vocals; electric lead and rhythm guitar
- Dennis Wilson – lead vocals

Additional musicians and production staff

- Hal Blaine – drums, wood blocks, claves
- Chuck Britz – sound engineer
- Steve Douglas – tenor saxophone
- Plas Johnson – tenor saxophone
- Larry Knechtel – bass guitar
- Larry Levine – sound engineer
- Jay Migliori – baritone saxophone
- Bill Pitman – acoustic and electric rhythm guitar
- Leon Russell – Hammond B-3 organ
- Billy Strange – electric mandolin
- Tommy Tedesco – baritone guitar, mandolin
- Julius Wechter – tambourine, timpani
- Marilyn Wilson – harmony and backing vocals

=== Charts ===
Chart (1965)	Peak position
Canadian RPM Singles Chart	17
U.S. Billboard Hot 100	12
US Cashbox Top 100	13

== Bette Midler version ==
"Do You Want to Dance"
- Side A of the 1972 Canadian single

Single by Bette Midler

from the album The Divine Miss M
- B-side: "Superstar"
- Released: November 1972
- Recorded: 1972
- Studio: Atlantic Recording Studios (New York, NY)
- Genre: Pop
- Length: 2:44
- Label: Atlantic
- Songwriter: Bobby Freeman
- Producer: Joel Dorn

Bette Midler singles chronology
"Do You Want to Dance" (1972)	"Boogie Woogie Bugle Boy" (1972)

Bette Midler included the song—with the original title restored, "Do You Want to Dance"—on her 1972 debut album The Divine Miss M as its opening track. In contrast to the Bobby Freeman, Cliff Richard, and Beach Boys versions, which are uptempo rock and roll songs, Midler slowed the tempo of the song down to a soulful sultry-sounding ballad. Midler's version was her first single release, reaching No. 17 on the Billboard Hot 100 chart in early 1973 and the top 10 of the Go-Set National Charts in Australia during April 1973. The song was No. 76 on Billboard Year-End Hot 100 singles of 1973.

In 1985, Ula Hedwig, a Bette Midler-soundalike and former backup singer, sang the song emulating Bette Midler's version for a Mercury Sable television commercial after Midler refused to sing in the commercial herself. Midler sued Ford Motor Company in response in the now-memorable case Midler v. Ford Motor Co. in which she argued that utilizing a voice impersonator without her permission constituted appropriation of her personality rights. The Ninth Circuit Court of Appeals ruled in favor of Midler and made Ford pull the advertisement.

=== Charts ===
Chart (1972)	Peak position
Australia (Kent Music Report)	10
Canada Top Singles (RPM)	18
Canada Adult Contemporary (RPM)	1
US Billboard Hot 100	17
US Adult Contemporary (Billboard)	8

== The Ramones' version ==
"Do You Wanna Dance?"
- US single, autographed by several Ramones

Single by Ramones

from the album Rocket to Russia
- B-side: "Babysitter"
- Released: March 24, 1978
- Recorded: 1977 (New York)
- Genre: Punk rock; surf punk; bubblegum
- Length: 1:55
- Label: Sire
- Songwriter: Bobby Freeman
- Producers: Tony Bongiovi, T. Erdelyi

Ramones singles chronology
"Rockaway Beach" (1977)	"Do You Wanna Dance?" (1978)	"Don't Come Close" (1978)

Audio
- "Do You Wanna Dance?" on YouTube

The Ramones' released a version of "Do You Wanna Dance?" on their album Rocket to Russia, released in 1977. Record World said that the Ramones' treatment "is brief, rough and to the point". Their version debuted at Number 96 on the Billboard Hot 100 on April 15, 1978, remained on the Hot 100 for five weeks, peaking at Number 86 on May 6, 1978.

The song was used in the 1979 film Rock 'n' Roll High School for a dance number featuring the drill team and football team wearing their actual uniforms from MCHS. A live version of the song was used as the B-side to the song "Rock 'n' Roll High School", a musical focal point of the movie.

The Ramones' version was featured in a television advertisement for the release of Wall-E on DVD.

=== Charts ===
Chart (1978)	Peak position
US (Billboard Hot 100)	86

== In popular culture ==
- The original Bobby Freeman recording features in the comedy-drama film American Graffiti (1973).
- Grateful Dead's Jerry Garcia is rumored to have recorded the guitar on the original Bobby Freeman version. However, there is no definitive documentation of this.
- D-TV set the original Bobby Freeman recording to Flowers and Trees and the Nutcracker Suite segment (Chinese Dance) from Fantasia.

== Sources ==
- Badman, Keith (2004). The Beach Boys: The Definitive Diary of America's Greatest Band, on Stage and in the Studio. Backbeat Books. ISBN 978-0-87930-818-6.
- Dillon, Mark (2012). Fifty Sides of the Beach Boys: The Songs That Tell Their Story. ECW Press. ISBN 978-1-77090-198-8.
- O'Regan, Jadey (2014). When I Grow Up: The Development of the Beach Boys' Sound (1962-1966) (PDF) (Thesis). Queensland Conservatorium. doi:10.25904/1912/2556.
- Wilson, Brian; Greenman, Ben (2016). I Am Brian Wilson: A Memoir. Da Capo Press. ISBN 978-0-306-82307-7.
