= The Man with All the Toys =

Single by the Beach Boys

from the album The Beach Boys' Christmas Album
- B-side: "Blue Christmas"
- Released: November 9, 1964
- Recorded: June 25, 1964
- Genre: Rock, christmas
- Length: 1:32
- Label: Capitol
- Songwriters: Brian Wilson; Mike Love
- Producer: Brian Wilson

The Beach Boys singles chronology
| "Dance, Dance, Dance" (1964) | "The Man with All the Toys" (1964) | "Do You Wanna Dance?" (1965) |

"The Man with All the Toys" is a Christmas song written by Brian Wilson and Mike Love for the American rock band the Beach Boys. It was released on their 1964 album The Beach Boys' Christmas Album. As a single that year it had limited success (No. 3 on the Billboard Christmas chart), but built sales over successive Christmases and is listed by Billboard in the Top 100 selling Christmas songs in history, though well below the Beach Boys' 1963 Christmas single "Little Saint Nick".

A French-language version of this song was recorded in 1968 by Canadian singer Renée Martel, under the title "As-tu vu le Père Noël?".

Wilson re-recorded this song for his 2005 Christmas album, What I Really Want for Christmas.

D-TV Disney set the song to the two Silly Symphonies, Santa's Workshop and The Night Before Christmas.

== Personnel ==
- Brian Wilson – lead vocals, piano, bass guitar
- Mike Love – lead vocals
- Carl Wilson – lead guitar, harmony vocals
- Al Jardine – rhythm guitar, harmony vocals
- Dennis Wilson – drums, harmony vocals
