= Dance, Dance, Dance (The Beach Boys song) =

1964 single by The Beach Boys

- U.S. picture sleeve

Single by the Beach Boys

from the album The Beach Boys Today!
- B-side: "The Warmth of the Sun"
- Released: October 26, 1964
- Recorded: October 9, 1964
- Studio: RCA Victor Studio, Los Angeles
- Genre: Rock and roll
- Length: 1:59
- Label: Capitol
- Composers: Brian Wilson; Carl Wilson
- Lyricists: Brian Wilson; Mike Love
- Producer: Brian Wilson

The Beach Boys singles chronology
"When I Grow Up (To Be a Man)" (1964)	"Dance, Dance, Dance" (1964)	"The Man with All the Toys" (1964)

Audio sample
- file; help

"Dance, Dance, Dance" is a song by the American rock band the Beach Boys from their 1965 album Beach Boys Today! Written by Brian Wilson, Carl Wilson, and Mike Love, it was first issued as a single in October 1964, backed with "The Warmth of the Sun". "Dance, Dance, Dance" marked Carl's first recognized writing contribution to a Beach Boys single, his contribution being the song's primary guitar riff and solo.

== Composition ==
"Dance, Dance, Dance" was composed by Brian and Carl Wilson, while the lyrics were written by Brian and Mike Love. Although many pop songs raise their key at the start of a final chorus, "Dance, Dance, Dance" subverts this convention by modulating in the middle of the verse.

Billboard described the song as having a "tremendous rock -surfin' beat and groovy lyrics," saying that the Beach Boys "have never sounded better." Cash Box described it as a "sensational hot-rod-surfin' [rocker],... that zips along with money-makin' glee."

== Variations ==
The song was originally released in mono, while a remixed stereo version was released on the compilation Hawthorne, CA. An early version of the song, with different lyrics and arrangement, appears as a bonus track on The Beach Boys Today!/Summer Days (And Summer Nights!!) two-fer CD.

== Personnel ==
Credits from Craig Slowinski.

The Beach Boys

- Al Jardine – backing and harmony vocals; rhythm guitar
- Mike Love – lead, backing and harmony vocals
- Brian Wilson – lead, backing and harmony vocals; bass guitar
- Carl Wilson – backing and harmony vocals; lead guitar (twelve-string)
- Dennis Wilson – backing and harmony vocals; drums

Additional musicians

- Hal Blaine – sleigh bells, triangle, tambourine, castanets
- Glen Campbell – acoustic rhythm/lead guitar
- Steve Douglas – tenor saxophone
- Carl Fortina – accordion
- Jay Migliori – baritone saxophone
- Ray Pohlman – 6-string bass guitar

== Charts ==
Chart (1964)	Peak position
Canadian RPM Singles Chart	7
UK Singles Chart	24
U.S. Billboard Hot 100	8

== Cover versions ==
- Wilson Phillips – featuring Brian Wilson's daughters Carnie and Wendy – recorded the song for their album California.
- Big Time Rush sang a cover of this song on the special "Big Time Beach Party".
- The song was recorded and released by Jan & Dean on their 1982 album, One Summer Night/Live.
- Joanie Bartels covered this song on her 1991 album, Dancin' Magic.
