= Chuck Britz =

American recording engineer

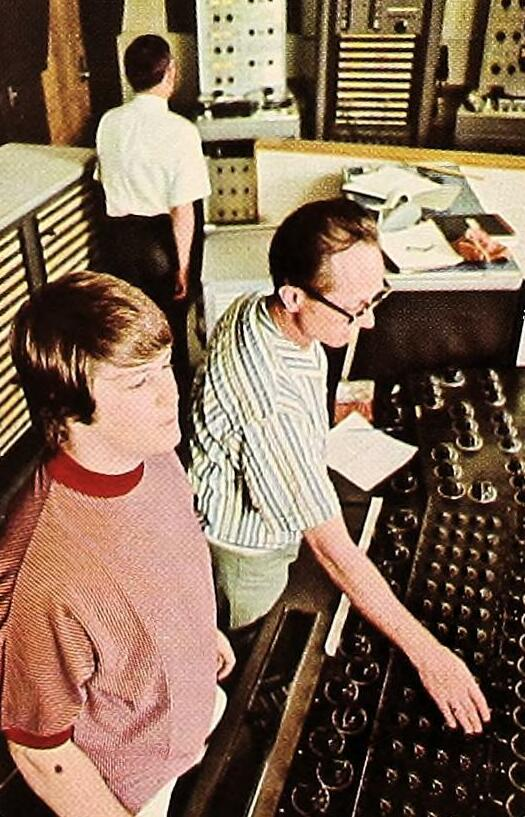
- Brian Wilson with Britz recording Pet Sounds, early 1966

Background information
- Born: Charles Dean Britz; November 7, 1927; Cameron, Oklahoma, U.S.
- Died: August 21, 2000 (aged 72) Paradise, California, U.S.
- Occupation: Recording engineer

Charles Dean Britz (November 7, 1927 – August 21, 2000) was a recording engineer who worked with Jan and Dean, Brian Wilson and The Beach Boys, P. F. Sloan and The Grass Roots on numerous albums between 1962 and 1967.

== Biography ==
Britz was born in 1927 to Charles and Elsie Britz in Cameron, Oklahoma. He was involved in long-range photography with the Army Air Corps fifth reconnaissance squadron from 1945 to 1947. He began his career in the recording industry in 1952, recording big bands for the Armed Forces Networks and the Salvation Army Band. In 1960, Britz went to work at Western Recorders and began engineering numerous rock n' roll records. Britz met Brian Wilson when the Beach Boys were cutting demos at Western Recorders. Influential in Wilson's development as a musician, he would go on to record and mix most of their hit records between 1963 and 1967. He worked with Jan and Dean and through this association later with P. F. Sloan and The Grass Roots. He also recorded music for TV and movies.

Britz died of brain cancer in Paradise, California, at the age of 72.
