= Heussenstamm =

Heussenstamm is a surname. Notable people with the surname include:

- Frances Heussenstamm (1928–2019), American artist and psychologist
- George Heussenstamm (1926–2024), American composer
- John Heussenstamm (born 1953), American guitarist and music educator
- Paul Heussenstamm (born 1949), American painter and lecturer
