= Bystander =

Bystander may refer to:

== In media ==
- Bystander (novel), a 1930 novel by Maxim Gorki
- Bystander (magazine), was a British weekly tabloid magazine
- The Australian Bystander (1914–1924), magazine produced in Sydney
- Guilty Bystander, a 1950 independent film production
- Innocent Bystanders (film), a 1972 film directed by Peter Collinson
- Iowa Bystander, an Iowa newspaper targeted toward an African-American audience

== In music ==
- The Bystanders, a Welsh close harmony pop group, formed in 1962
- Bystander (album), a 2011 six track extended play by Canadian alternative rock band Jets Overhead
- Innocent Bystanders, were a Perth-based band formed in 1983

== Other meanings ==
- Bystander effect, a social psychological phenomenon wherein individuals do not offer help in an emergency when other people are present
- Bystander effect (radiobiology), the phenomenon in which unirradiated cells exhibit irradiated effects as a result of signals received from nearby irradiated cells
- Bystander Nunatak, a geographical feature in Antarctica
- Perpetrators, victims, and bystanders, a typology in genocide studies

== See also ==
- Innocent bystander (disambiguation)
- Rubbernecking
- Witness
