= Andrea (disambiguation) =

Andrea is a given name common in many parts of the world.

Andrea may also refer to:

== Weather ==
- List of storms named Andrea

== Ships ==
- SS Andrea, an Italian cargo ship
- SS Andrea Doria, an Italian ocean liner which capsized and sank on 25 July 1956

== Media ==
=== Albums ===
- Andrea (Andrea Bocelli album), 2004
- Andrea (The Sunrays album) or the title song (see below), 1966

=== Songs ===
- "Andrea" (The Sunrays song), 1966
- Andrea (Bad Bunny and Buscabulla song), 2022
- "Andrea", by Fabrizio De André from Rimini, 1978
- "Andrea", by Toronto from Greatest Hits, 1984
- "Andrea", by MxPx from Life in General, 1996

=== Other media ===
- Andrea (film), a 1973 Argentine musical comedy film
- Andrea (The Spanish Tragedy), a character in Thomas Kyd's play The Spanich Tragedy
- Andrea (The Walking Dead), a character in the comic book and television series The Walking Dead
- Andrea Chénier, colloquially Andrea, an 1896 opera by Umberto Giordano
- Andrea, a character in the animated family comedy film Chibi Maruko-chan: A Boy From Italy
- Andrea (Bulgarian singer), or her eponymous 2010 album
- Andrea (Macedonian singer)
- Andrea, the pen name Dorothy Gordon (Australian actress) (1891–1985) used, during her career as a columnist and radio personality

== Other uses ==
- Andrea (Asawa), public artwork by Ruth Asawa in San Francisco
- Project Andrea, an effort by the Chilean military dictatorship to manufacture sarin gas

== See also ==
- Andria (disambiguation)
