= Tower Records (record label) =

American record label (1964–1970)

- Parent company: Universal Music Group
- Founded: 1964
- Defunct: 1970
- Distributors: Capitol Records; Sony Music/Columbia (Pink Floyd catalog)
- Genre: Various
- Country of origin: United States

Tower Records was an American record label active from 1964 to 1970. A subsidiary of Capitol Records, Tower often released music by artists who were relatively low-profile in compared to those released on the parent label, including artists—such as The Standells and the Chocolate Watchband—later recognized as "garage bands". For this reason Tower is often associated with the garage rock phenomenon of the 1960s.

== Overview ==
Named after Capitol's headquarters building, Tower was formed as a subsidiary to Capitol in 1964. In its early years, it released recordings by British invasion artists like Freddie and the Dreamers, (whose "I'm Telling You Now" became Tower's only No. 1 hit on Billboard) and Tom Jones (only 6 songs recorded in 1963, that were released by Tower on the strength of his hit "It's Not Unusual" two years later in 1965, much to the dismay of the singer, who was actually signed to London subsidiary, Parrot). It also gave Nilsson his first national releases. Tower's first single (No. 101) was "Car Party/Outta Gas" by The Sunrays, a California pop group produced and managed by Murry Wilson, father of Beach Boys Brian, Dennis and Carl.

Tower record labels from 1964 to approximately 1968 had a solid brownish-orange color. This design was used for both singles and albums. Starting sometime around late 1968 or early 1969 the design was changed to a multicolored stripe label, and again, the stripe design was used for both singles and albums. The stripe label lasted until Tower ceased operations sometime around 1970. Tower releases have numerous many small variations of label type for stereo and mono releases and re-pressings. Minor label variations also sometimes make it possible to determine which of the three Capitol Records factories manufactured each copy.

In 1965, Tower made a bit of a risky move by releasing "You Turn Me On" by Ian Whitcomb, a song that was considered racy by some. It became Whitcomb's biggest hit (and Tower's only other Top 10 record, peaking at No. 8 on Billboard). Other Tower hits that year included "I Live For The Sun" by The Sunrays and "Dirty Water", by The Standells.

In 1966, the label became one of the premiere purveyors of what would later be called garage rock. While not releasing recordings from this genre exclusively, it seemed their greatest chart successes came from garage bands, such as "Blues' Theme" from The Wild Angels by Davie Allan & the Arrows.

Tower released the first recordings by Pink Floyd in the U.S. in 1967 without success after acquiring the rights from EMI's UK Columbia label (a different company than CBS-owned Columbia Records in the USA). Tower released three Pink Floyd albums. The five Pink Floyd singles on Tower have become the most valuable (fetching three figures in mint condition) and sought-after of the label's recordings. Tower released the single "See Emily Play" (Tower 356) three times between July 1967 and late 1968, but each time it failed to reach the top 40. Two other Pink Floyd singles, "Flaming" (Tower 378) and "Let There Be More Light" (Tower 440) are especially rare and were not released at all in the U.K. After the Tower label was dissolved the Pink Floyd albums were re-issued on another Capitol/EMI subsidiary, Harvest Records and later Capitol Records.

Several singles by The Chocolate Watch Band were released also in 1967. Today these are very collectible. Mississippi "sunshine pop" group Eternity's Children (who evolved into Starbuck in the 70's) placed Tower back on the charts with "Mrs. Bluebird" in the summer of 1968.

A&R man Mike Curb joined the label in 1968. Curb had a hand in releasing several soundtracks on the Tower label, most notably, Wild in the Streets, featuring Tower's last major hit: Max Frost and the Troopers' "The Shape of Things To Come".

Capitol shut down Tower Records in 1970. In 1992, the original label was used as part of EMI's "Legends Of Rock And Roll" series of CDs for their Best Of Freddie And The Dreamers compilation. With the sale of most of EMI's recorded music operations to Universal Music Group in 2012, UMG now owns and handles the Tower Records catalog through Capitol, with the exception of the Pink Floyd catalogue, which is owned worldwide by Sony Music since its acquisition in 2024 for $400 million (previously, it was licensed by the band in the UK and Europe to Warner Music Group's Parlophone unit and in the US and the rest of the world to Sony). Other Tower releases by British Invasion acts such as Freddie and the Dreamers, which Tower/Capitol acquired from EMI, are property of Parlophone today.

== Label variations ==
- 1964–1968: Brownish orange label with Tower logo on left side
- 1968–1970: Multi-color striped label with Tower logo on left side (album labels feature the logo at the top)

== Charted singles ==
- Chittlins—Gus Jenkins—Tower 107—US No. 113, 11/64
- Apache '65—The Arrows featuring Davie Allan—Tower 116—US No. 64, 2/65
- This Sporting Life—Ian Whitcomb & Bluesville—Tower 120—US No. 100, 3/65
- "I'm Telling You Now"—Freddie & The Dreamers—Tower 125—US No. 1, 3/65
- Little Lonely One—Tom Jones—Tower 126—US No. 42, 5/65
- You Were Made For Me—Freddie & The Dreamers—Tower 127—US No. 21, 5/65
- You Turn Me On (Turn On Song)—Ian Whitcomb & Bluesville—Tower 134—US No. 8, 5/65
- I Live For The Sun—The Sunrays—Tower 148—US No. 51, 9/65
- N-E-R-V-O-U-S! -- Ian Whitcomb—Tower 155—US No. 59, 9/65
- Send A Letter To Me—Freddie & The Dreamers—Tower 163—US No. 123, 10/65
- Dirty Water—The Standells—Tower 185—US No. 11, 4/66
- Chills And Fever—Tom Jones—Tower 190—US No. 125, 12/65
- Andrea—The Sunrays—Tower 191—US No. 41, 1/66
- Still—The Sunrays—Tower 224—US No. 93, 5/66
- Sometimes Good Guys Don't Wear White—The Standells—Tower 257—US No. 43, 8/66
- Theme From "The Wild Angels"—Davie Allan & The Arrows—Tower 267—US No. 99, 11/66
- Where Did Robinson Crusoe Go With Friday On Saturday Night—Ian Whitcomb—Tower 274—US No. 101, 11/66
- Why Pick On Me—The Standells—Tower 282—US No. 54, 10/66
- Winchester Cathedral—Dana Rollin—Tower 283—US No. 71, 11/66
- Blue's Theme—The Arrows featuring Davie Allan—Tower 295—US No. 37, 4/67
- Riot On Sunset Strip—The Standells—Tower 314—US No. 133, 3/67
- Edelweiss—Vince Hill—Tower 323—US No. 119, 4/67
- Devil's Angels—Davie Allan & The Arrows—Tower 341—US No. 97, 7/67
- Can't Help But Love You—The Standells—Tower 348—US No. 78, 11/67
- See Emily Play—Pink Floyd—Tower 356—US No. 134, 9/67
- Mrs. Bluebird—Eternity's Children—Tower 416—US No. 69, 7/68
- Shape Of Things To Come—Max Frost & The Troopers—Tower 419—US No. 22, 9/68
- Sunshine Among Us—Eternity's Children—Tower 439—US No. 117, 9/68
- Fifty-Two Percent—Max Frost & The Troopers—Tower 452—US No. 123, 12/68

== Charted albums ==
- I'm Telling You Now—Freddie & The Dreamers—Tower 5003—US No. 86, 5/65

Features only two tracks by Freddie & The Dreamers; the other 10 tracks are by other British artists and groups

- You Turn Me On—Ian Whitcomb—Tower 5004—US No. 125, 7/65
- Dirty Water—The Standells—Tower 5027—US No. 52, 7/66
- Way Out West—Mae West—Tower 5028—US No. 116, 7/66
- The Wild Angels (Soundtrack) -- Davie Allan & The Arrows—Tower 5043—US No. 17, 10/66
- The Wild Angels, Volume II—Davie Allan & The Arrows—Tower 5056—US No. 94, 4/67
- Devil's Angels (Soundtrack) -- Davie Allan & The Arrows—Tower 5074—US No. 165, 8/67
- The Piper at the Gates of Dawn—Pink Floyd—Tower 5093—US No. 131, 12/67
- Wild In The Streets—Soundtrack—Tower 5099—US No. 12, 7/68
- Best Of The Soundtracks (Compilation) -- Various artists—Tower 5148—US No. 198, 2/69

== Other Tower label artists ==
- Davie Allan & the Arrows
- Laurindo Almeida
- Heinz (Heinz Burt of The Tornados)
- Ray Chafin
- The Chocolate Watch Band
- Dick Curless

Recorded for Tower Records between c. 1965 until 1970, when he was moved to the roster of Tower's parent label, Capitol. At some point during Curless' tenure with Tower, they also acquired Curless' earliest recordings, which he had made for the Event and Tiffany labels, and re-issued them in a string of Compilation LP's.

- Mac Curtis
- The E-Types
- Gini Eastwood
- Eternity's Children
- Freddie & The Dreamers
- Max Frost and the Troopers
- Annette Funicello

Her one and only single on Tower, "What's A Girl To Do"/"When You Get What You Want" (Tower 326), shows her name misspelled as "Annettte"

- Brother Dave Gardner
- The Green Beans

Rare garage single with an even rarer promotional color picture sleeve

- Susan Hart
- Vince Hill
- Jake Holmes
- Gus Jenkins
- Tom Jones
- Dean Martin
- Darlene McCrea (of The Cookies)
- Harry Nilsson
- Pink Floyd
- Dana Rollin
- Shuggy Ray Smith

"Little Tommy's Letter"/"Ruth From Duluth" (Tower 187)

- The Standells
- The Sunrays
- Teddy & The Pandas
- Them
- Mae West
- Ian Whitcomb
- Justin Wilson
