= Don't Go Looking Back =

Studio album by Innocent Bystanders
- Released: June 1986
- Recorded: 1986; Planet Studios, Perth, Western Australia
- Genre: Indie rock
- Label: Chase Records
- Producer: Peter Walker

Don't Go Looking Back is the debut album by Australian rock band Innocent Bystanders, originally released in 1986. The album reached #59 on the Australian album charts in September 1986.

== Track listing ==
All songs written by Brett Keyser.

1. "Just My Mothers Son"
2. "Lookin' Down At You"
3. "Let Me In"
4. "I Don't Care"
5. "Dangerous"
6. "Hard To Know"
7. "Those Days"
8. "Late Night Criers"
9. "Don't Go Lookin' Back"

== Charts ==
Chart (1986)	Peak position
Australia (Kent Music Report)	59

== Personnel ==
=== Innocent Bystanders ===
- Brett Keyser – vocals
- John Dalzel – bass
- Al Kash – drums
- John Heussenstamm – guitar
- Don Walker – Piano, C-3, DX-7

=== Additional musicians ===
- Paul Ewing – Hammond, on "Just My Mother's Son", Piano, C-3 on "Those Days"
- Peter Walker – Acoustic & electric guitar

== Credits ==
- Produced by Peter Walker
- Recorded by Graham Owens & Peter Walker
- Mixed by Steve Bywaters & Peter Walker
- Executive Producers John Hopkins & Brett Townsend
- Directed by Brett Townsend
- Second Engineer Mark Whitehouse
