= The Many Moods of Murry Wilson =

Studio album by Murry Wilson
- Released: October 1967
- Recorded: 1967
- Studios: Gold Star (Hollywood, California); Western Recorders (Hollywood, California)
- Genres: Easy listening; lounge
- Length: 30:12
- Label: Capitol
- Producer: Murry Wilson

Murry Wilson chronology
The Many Moods of Murry Wilson (1967)	The Break Away EP (2019)

Professional ratings
Review scores
Source	Rating
Allmusic	2.5/5 stars
AlbumReviewDatabase	74/100

The Many Moods of Murry Wilson is the only studio album by American songwriter and talent manager Murry Wilson. The album was released on Capitol Records in October 1967, the same record label that the Beach Boys were contracted to at the time.

== Background ==
Murry Wilson is best known as the father of Brian, Carl, and Dennis Wilson. He acted as the first manager of The Beach Boys from their formation until he was acrimoniously fired in 1965; Murry's firing was in response to his long history of physical and mental abuse toward both his sons and the other members of the Beach Boys.

After his 1965 dismissal, Murry attempted to restart his own career as a songwriter, which had seen limited success in the early 1950s. In an attempt to revitalize his songwriting career, Wilson recorded and submitted unsolicited commercial jingles to Kentucky Fried Chicken and Taco Bell, "all of which were politely turned down" by those companies.

== Production ==
Band biographer Steven Gaines has asserted that Murry arranged for Capitol Records to charge production costs of the album "back to the Beach Boys' account" with the label. According to Nick Venet, "Capitol made a whole album and released it [for Murry] ... just so they could satisfy him and so he wouldn't hassle them so much on some of the Beach Boys things."

One track, "Italia", was composed by Al Jardine. He later wrote, "I wrote it in '63 and it was originally called 'Pink Champagne.' Brian liked it so much, he played it for his Dad who said it reminded him of Italy with its European feel. Murry recorded it with the Capitol Records Orchestra and changed the title to 'Italia.'" Brian produced the track, but was not credited on the album.

Murry does not appear to have actually played any instruments or sung on the album, rather acting as the record's producer as well as songwriter on five tracks. The songs were all arranged and conducted by industry veteran Don Ralke.

Steven Gaines notes that “Murry still fancied himself a talent scout and showcased a new discovery on the LP-a forty-year-old plumber named Eck Kynor who had helped with the renovations on Murry's Whittier house"; Kynor's contributions included songwriting credits on "The Plumber's Tune" and "The Happy Song". "Heartbreak Lane" was copyrighted in 1962 with Brian Wilson listed as co-writer, who was uncredited on the album. The song had been previously recorded by the John Buzon Trio. The final track on the album was a collaboration between Murry and his wife Audree titled "Betty's Waltz," likely named for Audree's mother. The song was published in 1957 as "Chinese Waltz".

=== Release, promotion and contemporary reviews ===
The Many Moods of Murry Wilson was first released by Capitol Records in October 1967. Capitol released the album on vinyl in the United States, United Kingdom, France, Canada, and Germany.

In November 1967, Murry embarked on a month-long tour of Europe and the UK to promote the album. Music publisher Al Kohn later acknowledged orchestrating Murry's promotional tour to bring about face-to-face meetings with Sea of Tunes subpublisher Francis, Day & Hunter; Kohn's hope was to show Wilson that the company "had the talent and enthusiasm to effectively represent his new compositions, as well as those in the Sea of Tunes catalog."

During the UK tour, Murry told Britain's Disc & Music Echo that "after 'Good Vibrations' Brian lost a lot of confidence. He didn't think he could ever write anything as good as that again ... With [my] LP I'm going to nudge my boys' competitive spirit."

"Leaves" was issued as a single in the United States backed with "The Plumber's Tune" in December 1967 while demonstration records of "The Plumber's Tune" backed with "Love Won't Wait" or "The Happy Song" were produced by EMI for the Capitol label in the United Kingdom. In the end, the album did not chart, received very little press or radio airplay, and the amount of copies pressed or sold is unknown.

== Legacy ==
=== Later reviews and reactions ===
Later reviews of The Many Moods of Murry Wilson cite it as an unremarkable example of late-1960s easy listening or beautiful music.

In a 2.5/5 star review for AllMusic, Lindsay Planer wrote that "The contents are pure orchestral schmaltz, similar to the ersatz easy listening and so-called 'beautiful music' being produced by the 101 Strings Orchestra or Capitol Records' own Hollyridge Strings. In fact, it is presumed the latter unit are instrumentally responsible for much (if not all) of the actual performances on this 12-track platter." Planer notes that although several of Murry's compositions "do reveal an undeniable undercurrent of melancholia," "even earnest Beach Boys enthusiasts will be hard pressed to revisit The Many Moods of Murry Wilson."

Kingsley Abbott wrote a 2 star review for Record Collector magazine in response to the 2009 CD reissue. They wrote that Wilson's credited role of "'conceived and produced by' [...] may have actually meant little, as the arrangements and conducting chores on the 12 sometimes over-orchestrated pieces were done by Don Ralke." The review closes by stating that "We assume that some Beach Boy/Brian Wilson completists will want it, but wonder who else."

In his 2016 autobiography I Am Brian Wilson, Brian Wilson briefly mentioned his father's only solo album: "He was at a crossroads in his life where he didn't know if the things he had built were making any sense. A few years later he put out a record called The Many Moods of Murry Wilson. It had four of his own songs and arrangements of some Beach Boys songs, including 'The Warmth of the Sun.'" Brian concluded that a poison pen letter Murry had sent Brian a few years earlier (and which later gained infamy among Beach Boys fans) contained more of his true personality than The Many Moods of Murry Wilson, "for better and for worse. It was kind of his SMiLE, though I doubt he was smiling at all when he wrote it."

=== Re-releases ===
The album marked the last time Murry Wilson's solo music would be officially released until the Sunrays' 1996 retrospective compilation album For Collectors Only over 20 years after his death.

Capitol Records reissued the album on CD in Japan in 2002. British independent label Cherry Red Records reissued the album on CD in Europe during 2009, and in Japan in 2016. The album has never been reissued on vinyl beyond its original pressing.

== Track listing ==
1. "Love Won't Wait" (Murry Wilson) – 3:12
2. "The Happy Song" (Eck Kynor) – 2:04
3. "The Warmth of the Sun" (Brian Wilson, Mike Love) – 2:45
4. "Broken Heart" (George Kizanis) – 2:08
5. "Leaves" (M. Wilson) – 2:40
6. "The Plumber's Tune" (Kynor) – 2:20
7. "Painting with Teardrops" (M. Wilson) – 2:32
8. "Islands in the Sky" (Rick Henn) – 2:51
9. "Just 'Round the River Bend" (Don Ralke, Deeda Patrick) – 2:09
10. "Italia" (Al Jardine) – 2:28
11. "Heartbreak Lane" (M. Wilson) – 2:41
12. "Betty's Waltz" (M. Wilson, Audree Wilson) – 1:49
