= Surf punk =

Surf punk may refer to:

- Surf punk (music genre), a genre of surf music and punk rock
- Surf punk (surf culture), a term for a territorial surfer
- Surf Punks, a 1976 pop punk band
