= Dick Allix =

- Born: 3 May 1945; Gravesend, England
- Died: 13 March 2024 (aged 78)
- Occupations: sports promoter; darts player manager; businessman; musician
- Organization: Professional Darts Corporation
- Known for: Co-founding Professional Darts Corporation; Drummer for pop band Vanity Fare
- Musical career
- Genres: pop, rock
- Instrument: Drums
- Years active: 1966–1970
- Formerly of: Vanity Fare

Dick Allix (3 May 1945 – 13 March 2024) was an English businessman. He co-founded the Professional Darts Corporation.

== Biography ==
Allix was the drummer for Vanity Fare, a pop/rock group who released songs such as "I Live for the Sun", "Early in the Morning", and "Hitchin' a Ride", all of which charted in the top 20 of the UK Singles Chart, with the latter charting as high as number two in foreign countries. Allix left the band in 1970 and worked in sports promotion in the 1980s onwards.

In 1979, Allix was introduced to darts by Eric Bristow. In 1992, he and Tommy Cox co-founded the World Darts Council, with Allix becoming Chief Executive. The WDC was later restructured into the Professional Darts Corporation, with Allix moving into the role of Event Director in 2001.

Allix was inducted into the PDC Hall of Fame in 2010.

Allix retired from the PDC in 2014, but continued working as a manager. He died on 13 March 2024, aged 78.
