= Andria (name) =

The name Andria is of Greek origin and means "manly" or "brave," as it is a feminine form of Andrew. It is associated with strength and valor and has been popularized through Christianity, as Saint Andrew was one of the Twelve Apostles. The name is also used in other languages and regions, and in some cases, it can be masculine or a place name.

Notable people with the name include:

== Given name ==
- Andria D'Souza, Indian actress
- Andria Balanchivadze (1906–1992), Georgian composer
- Andria Hall (1956–2025), British ballerina
- Andria Putkaradze (born 2013), Georgian child singer
- Andria Hunter (born 1967), Canadian ice hockey player
- Andria Lawrence (1936–2025), English actress
- Andria Tupola (born 1980), American politician

== Surname ==
- Alfonso Andria (born 1952), Italian politician
- Niccola Andria (1748–1814), Italian physician and writer

== See also ==
- Andria (disambiguation)
- Andrias (name)
- Andrea (disambiguation)
