= Andrea (The Sunrays album) =

Studio album by The Sunrays
- Released: 1966
- Studio: Gold Star (Hollywood, California)
- Genre: Pop
- Label: Tower Records
- Producer: Murry Wilson

Professional ratings
Review scores
Source	Rating
Allmusic	2/5 stars

Andrea is the one and only album released by The Sunrays. The album was released in 1966 under Tower Records. The album included the band's three hits, "I Live for the Sun", "Andrea", and "Still".

== Track listing ==
=== Side one ===
All lead vocals Rick Henn unless otherwise stated

1. "Andrea" (Richard Henn) – 2:12
2. "A Little Dog and His Boy" (Richard Henn) – 2:44
3. "Have to Be Myself" (Hial King) – 2:21
4. "I Look Baby-I Can't See" (Donald Rockwell) – 2:36
5. "You Don't Phase Me" (Hial King) – 2:15
6. "Still" (Bill Anderson) – 2:30

=== Side two ===
1. "I Live for the Sun" (Richard Henn) – 2:27
2. "Jo Ann" (Eddy Medora) – 2:03 Lead Vocal: Eddy Medora
3. "Better Be Good to Me" (Hial King) – 3:05
4. "Bye Baby Bye" (Murry Wilson) – 2:07 Lead Vocal: Marty DiGiovanni
5. "Tears in My Eyes" (Eddy Medora) – 2:01 Lead Vocal: Eddy Medora
6. "Since My Findin' You" (Hial King) – 2:27
