= Shoulder surfing =

Shoulder surfing may refer to:

- Shoulder surfing (computer security)
- Shoulder surfing (surfing)
