= Sherrit =

Sherrit is a surname. Notable people with the surname include:

- Jim Sherrit (born 1948), Scottish ice hockey player
- John Sherrit (born 1962), Australian drummer
