= Andrea (The Sunrays song) =

Single by The Sunrays

from the album Andrea
- B-side: "You Don't Phase Me"
- Released: December 1965
- Recorded: December 1965
- Genre: Pop
- Length: 2:08
- Label: Tower
- Songwriter: Rick Henn
- Producer: Murry Wilson

The Sunrays singles chronology
"I Live for the Sun" (1965)	"Andrea" (1965)	"Still" (1966)

"Andrea" is a song by the American surf band The Sunrays. Composed by the band's singer/songwriter/drummer Rick Henn, it was the band's most successful single, peaking at #41 on the Billboard charts on March 5, 1966.

== Background ==
It was the title track, but the second single released from the band's only original album, Andrea. The first single, "I Live for the Sun", had peaked at #51 on October 23, 1965, and reached #20 in Australia, and a cover by Vanity Fare reached the same position in the UK. The band had previously released a single, "Outta Gas", that was not on the album. The song features a five-part harmony, produced by Murry Wilson, who was also the father and producer of the Beach Boys.

The Sunrays spent 1964 as the opening act for the Beach Boys on tour. After Wilson was dismissed as manager for his sons' band, he suggested that the Sunrays get some songs together to put out an album of their own. While on an airplane, guitarist Eddy Medora met "this beautiful stewardess, just lovely." He promised he would write a song about her when he returned home. He mentioned the conversation to Henn. By the time of the band's first rehearsal after returning home, Henn had completed writing the song. While the girl on the album cover was named Samantha, the band launched a nationwide contest, advertised in Tiger Beat, to find Andrea.
