= John Sherrit =

Australian drummer (born 1962)

- Birth name: John Sherrit
- Also known as: John Yak' Sherrit
- Born: 1962
- Origin: Perth, Western Australia
- Genres: Hard rock, blues rock, rock and roll, blues
- Occupation(s): Musician, sound engineer
- Instrument: drums
- Years active: 1982–present
- Labels: Chrysalis; EMI; Mammoth; Liberation Music

John "Yak" Sherrit (born 1962) is an Australian drummer best known for his drumming on several studio albums of Johnny Diesel and the Injectors, and touring with Diesel, Jimmy Barnes, and Richard Clapton.

== Biography ==
Sherrit first performed with Mark Lizotte in The Kind and Close Action. The Kind comprised Lizotte, Sherrit, Denise DeMarchi, Suze DeMarchi, Dean Denton, Gary Dunn and Boyd Wilson. Close Action included Lizotte and John Heussenstamm on guitars, together with Sherritt on drums and Bernie Bremond on saxophone. Sherrit went on to be a founding member of the Innocent Bystanders, formed in 1983 in Perth and they released a single, "Lebanon" in 1984 with the line-up of Diesel, John "Tatt" Dalzell on bass guitar, Brett Keyser on vocals, Cliff Kinneen on keyboards and Sherrit on drums. Innocent Bystanders travelled to Sydney to record their second single, "Dangerous", released in July 1986. They had attracted the attention of hard rockers, The Angels, and went on to record another single and an album, Don't Go Looking Back, which was released later in 1986 in 1986, several members of the Innocent Bystanders, including Sherrit, Bremond and Dalzell went on to form Johnny Diesel and the Injectors, fronted by lead singer and guitarist Lizotte, with George Dalstrom as a second guitarist. The group disbanding in early 1991.

Sherrit attended Lynwood Senior High School, and currently works as a sound engineer in Perth. Sherrit also performs in a corporate showband, Topkats, together with singer, James Morley (former bass player with The Angels), Nigel Shelbourne on bass, guitarist Killian Albrecht and keyboardist, Nikki Dagastino.
