= Frances Heussenstamm =

American artist and psychologist (1928–2019)

Frances Kovacs Heussenstamm
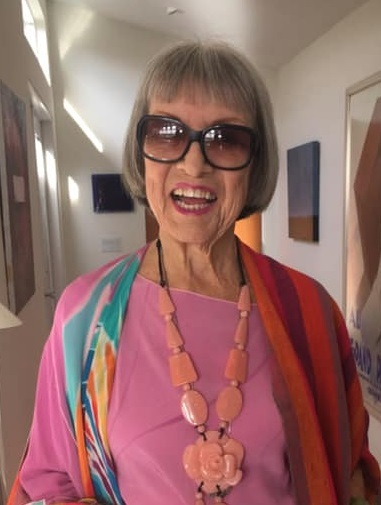
- Born: November 6, 1928; Cleveland, Ohio, U.S.
- Died: March 6, 2019 (aged 90)
- Education: University of Southern California
- Spouse: Karl Heussenstamm
- Children: 3, including Paul and John
- Scientific career
- Fields: Sociology, psychology

France Kovacs Heussenstamm (November 6, 1928 – March 6, 2019) was an American artist and psychologist. She was a professor of art and education at Columbia University, an associate professor at California State University, Los Angeles, and instructor at Sierra High School, Whittier, California. In sociology research, her experiment entitled, Bumper Stickers and the Cops, is widely referenced, as its findings continue to remain of controversy.

== Life and education ==
Heussenstamm was born in Cleveland to Fred Kovacs and Edna Jacqueline Reiter. She has two siblings, a younger sister, Marcia Kovacs and her brother, Jerry Kovacs, an engineer. She earned her Bachelor's at Whittier College in 1957, followed by her Master of Arts at Whittier College in 1960. She achieved a Doctor of Philosophy, from University of Southern California in 1968.

Heussenstamm, and her husband, Karl Heussenstamm had three sons, Paul, Mark and John.

Later in life, she struggled with brain injury from a car accident. At the age of 78, she continued to educate and lecture aboard more than 30 international cruises. She also completed twenty two large canvas paintings series titled The Circle.

== Career and contributions ==
Heussenstamm earned a PhD in sociology from University of Southern California at a time when this was a rarity for women. She was also a clinical psychologist and intensive journal instructor.

In 1969, Heussenstamm conducted an experiment, Bumper Stickers and the Cops. The experiment concluded that police officers give citations often with their own interests, as students with perfectly good driving records began receiving tickets because of newly placed Black Panther bumper stickers.

== Books ==
- Heussenstamm, Frances (1993) Blame It on Freud: A Guide to the Language of Psychology
- Heussenstamm, Frances (2013) Blurts! Talk about Brain Injury
- Heussenstamm, Frances (2018) Cruising Granny
