= Andrias (name) =

Andrias is a given name and surname. Notable people with the name include:

== Given name ==
- Andrias Edmundsson (born 2000), Faroese footballer
- Andrias Eriksen (born 1994), Faroese footballer
- Andrias Ghukasyan, Armenian politician

== Surname ==
- Kate Andrias, American legal scholar

== See also ==
- Andreas
- Andria (name)
- Andrias, a genus of giant salamanders
