= Summer Means New Love =

Instrumental by the Beach Boys

from the album Summer Days (And Summer Nights!!)
- Released: 1965
- Recorded: May 12 – June 1, 1965
- Genre: Orchestral pop
- Length: 1:59
- Label: Capitol
- Composer: Brian Wilson
- Producer: Brian Wilson

"Summer Means New Love" is an instrumental by the American rock band the Beach Boys from their 1965 album Summer Days (And Summer Nights!!). Composed by Brian Wilson, it was later released as the B-side to his first single, "Caroline, No", which subsequently appeared on Pet Sounds (1966).

The instrumental has been cited as one forerunner to the type of arrangements Brian Wilson would later experiment with on Pet Sounds the following year. It has since been covered by several artists with new, original lyrics – including by Wilson himself.

Cash Box described the single as an "easy-going laconic instrumental."

== Recording ==
"Summer Means New Love" was recorded over two dates. The primary instrumental track was recorded on May 12, at an unknown studio, with the guitar overdubbed at a June 1 session at CBS Columbia Square.

== Personnel ==
Per Alan Boyd and Craig Slowinski.

The Beach Boys

- Brian Wilson – piano

Session musicians and production staff

- Israel Baker – violin
- Arnold Belnick – violin
- Hal Blaine – drums
- Frank Capp – vibraphone
- Joseph DiFlore – viola
- Steve Douglas – tenor saxophone
- James Getzoff – violin
- William Hinshaw – french horn
- Harry Hyams – viola
- Carol Kaye – electric bass
- Bernard Kundell – violin
- Leonard Malarsky – violin
- Jay Migliori – baritone saxophone
- Ralph Schaeffer – violin
- Sid Sharp – violin
- Billy Strange – rhythm guitar
- Tommy Tedesco – lead guitar (overdubbed)
- Tibor Zelig – violin

== Release history ==
The track was first released in 1965 in mono on the band's album Summer Days (And Summer Nights!!) . On August 29, 2006, Capitol released the 40th Anniversary version of Pet Sounds with a 5.1 mix of Summer Means New Love being assembled for the first time. In 2012, the first stereo mix of the track was released on a reissue of Summer Days (And Summer Nights!!).
