= Avius =

AVIUS (band)
- Origin: Bath, England
- Genres: Alternative rock
- Years active: 2011-present
- Label: BA1 Records
- Members: Sebastian Brice; Adam DT; Bertie Whitfield

AVIUS was a UK-based, three piece alt/rock band.

== Personnel ==
The members of Avius were Sebastian Brice (guitar and vocals), Adam DT (bass guitar and vocals) and Bertie Whitfield (drums). They met while studying at Bath Spa University

Sebastian Brice is also a successful model and is the son of Trevor Brice, who was part of the 1960s band Vanity Fare.

== Career ==
In 2010 Avius was chosen to be one of the bands promoted by fashion brand Burberry in 'Burberry Acoustic' which saw Sebastian Brice and Avius featured in the London Evening Standard. and The Black Book.

In September 2011, Avius provided the live music accompaniment for Ennio Capasa's C'N'C Costume National show in Milan. The performance was broadcast live on the internet, via Camera Nazionale della Moda Italiana (National Chamber of Italian Fashion).

Avius made the finals (out of 7,000 performers) in the 2011 Pizza Express "Big Audition with Jamie Cullum" competition.

== Recordings ==
The EP "Avius" was recorded live at Studio Paranormal in 2011, and released by BA1 records, the in house label at the City of Bath College. It included the following songs (Lyrics: Sebastian Brice / Music: Avius):

- Holding On
- Said and Done
- 66 & 99
- Without Sin
