= Vanity Fare =

English pop/rock group

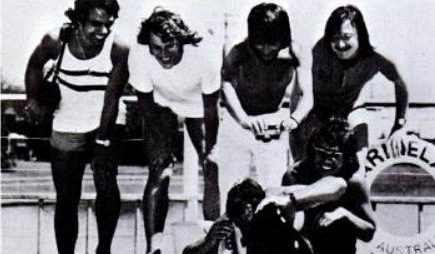
- Vanity Fare in 1971

Background information
- Origin: Kent, England
- Genres: Pop, rock
- Years active: 1968–present
- Label: Page One
- Members: Eddie Wheeler; Bernie Hagley; Steve Oakman; Graham Walker
- Past members: Trevor Brice; Tony Goulden; Dick Allix; Tony Jarrett; Barry Landeman; Jimmy Cassidy; Phil Kitto; Brian Johnson; Mark Ellen; Derek Burgess; Kev Thompson; Howard Tibble
- Website: vanityfare.co.uk

Vanity Fare (Note: often misspelled Vanity Fair, due to the similarity of the novel and magazine title) is an English pop/rock group formed in 1966. It released the million-selling song "Hitchin' a Ride", which became a hit in 1970.

== Career ==
=== Formation ===
School friends Trevor Brice (born 12 February 1945, Rochester, Kent, England) (vocals), Tony Goulden (born Anthony Goulden, 21 November 1942, Rochester) (guitar), Dick Allix (born Richard Allix, 3 May 1945, Gravesend, Kent) (drums), and Tony Jarrett (born Anthony Jarrett, 4 September 1943, in Rochester, Kent) (bass) formed the band in Kent in 1966, originally calling themselves The Avengers. Under that name, with Lee Fairbrother, Willum (born 15 July 1948, in Chatham, Kent (drums) [1964-68], they recorded a number of demos, including "Marianne", with record producer Joe Meek, but none were ever released. After that, they changed their name to The Sages and had one 45 single release on the RCA Victor label (47–8760), with "In The Beginning" on the A side and "I'm Not Going To Cry" on the B side. They played local clubs and were spotted by entrepreneur Roger Easterby, who became their manager and producer. Having changed the name of the band to Vanity Fare (Dick Allix, taking over the sticks from Lee Fairbrother in 1968), after the novel Vanity Fair by William Makepeace Thackeray, they signed to Larry Page's Page One Records.

=== Success ===
In mid 1968, Vanity Fare achieved a UK hit single with their first release, a cover of "I Live for the Sun", originally recorded in 1965 by the California group The Sunrays.

Following two more singles, "Summer Morning" and "Highway of Dreams," both of which failed to make the UK Singles Chart, they released their biggest UK hit, "Early in the Morning". Written by Mike Leander and Eddie Seago, it reached number 8 in that country in August 1969, number 12 in the US, and number 10 in Canada in early 1970. It sold over one million copies and was awarded a gold disc.

For their next release, "Hitchin' a Ride", they added keyboardist Barry Landeman (born 25 October 1947, Woodbridge, Suffolk, England), formerly of Kippington Lodge, to the group. "Hitchin' A Ride", written by Peter Callander and Mitch Murray, gave them a second million-selling hit, reaching No. 16 in the UK (January 1970), No. 1 for two weeks each on Chicago radio stations WCFL (May 1970) and WLS (June 1970), No. 5 on the Billboard Hot 100 (June–July 1970), and No. 3 in Canada.

The hit was preceded by a tour of the United States, following which both Dick Allix and Tony Goulden left the band and were replaced by guitarist and singer Eddie Wheeler and drummer Mark Ellen (died 18 February 2021).

Two more singles followed before the end of 1970: Mike Leander and Eddie Seago's "Come Tomorrow" and Roger Cook and Roger Greenaway's "Carolina's Coming Home", both of which failed to dent the charts on either side of the Atlantic. In addition, a belated US release of "Summer Morning" reached only No. 98, for two weeks.

Over the next couple of years more singles were released, including Tony Macaulay's "Better By Far" on DJM Records in 1972, but none of them entered the charts. Following that, they decided to concentrate on live performances, touring Europe, where they were generating hit singles.

=== Line-up changes ===
From the mid-1970s, amid many band member changes – including the departure of Jarrett, who was replaced by Bernie Hagley – the group recorded only sporadically. Trevor Brice left in 1979. Following Brice's departure, none of the founding members were still in the band.

=== Later years ===
In 1986, they competed to represent the UK in the Eurovision Song Contest, finishing third in the UK heat of A Song for Europe with the song "Dreamer", featuring Jimmy Cassidy on vocals and Phil Kitto on keyboards, alongside long-time members Eddie Wheeler and Bernie Hagley.

On 18 February 2005, original members Trevor Brice, Tony Goulden, Tony Jarrett, and Barry Landeman performed a one-off reunion gig at the Rainham Mark Social Club in Kent.

In 2007, they toured alongside P. J. Proby. In August 2015, after having played with the band for 45 years, drummer Mark Ellen retired and was replaced by Howard Tibble. In 2018, Graham Walker, from the Gary Moore Band, took over on drums.

Vanity Fare are still performing today, with the line-up of Hagley, Wheeler, Walker, and Steve Oakman. Wheeler and Hagley have taken up lead vocal duties. In his spare time, Brice sings second tenor with the City of Bath Male Choir, which reached the final of BBC One's Last Choir Standing. His son, Sebastian Brice, is part of the alt/rock band Avius.

Since 2021, Wheeler has also been a member of The Tremeloes.

The group's former drummer and PDC co-founder Dick Allix died on 14 March 2024 at the age of 78.

== Members ==
Classic line-up

- Trevor Brice - Lead vocals (1966–1979)
- Tony Goulden - Guitar (1966–1970)
- Tony Jarrett - Bass (1966–1974)
- Barry Landeman - Keyboards (1970–mid-1970s)
- Dick Allix - Drums (1968–1970)

Current

- Eddie Wheeler - Guitar, lead vocals (1970–present)
- Bernie Hagley - Bass, lead vocals (1974–present)
- Steve Oakman - Keyboard (2001–present)
- Graham Walker - Drums (2018–present)

Former

- Trevor Brice - Lead vocals (1966–1979)
- Brian Johnson - Lead vocals (1979–1980s)
- Jimmy Cassidy - Lead vocals (1980s–1990s)
- Tony Goulden - Guitar (1966–1970)
- Tony Jarrett - Bass (1966–1974)
- Lee "Willum" Fairbrother - Drums (1964-68)
- Derek Burgess - Bass (1974)
- Barry Landeman - Keyboard (1970–1974)
- Phil Kitto - Keyboard (1974–1990s)
- Kev Thompson - Keyboard (1990s–2001)
- Dick Allix - Drums (1968–1970; died 2024)
- Mark Ellen - Drums (1970–2015; died 2021)
- Howard Tibble - Drums (2015–2018)

== Discography ==
=== Albums ===
==== Studio albums ====
- The Sun. The Wind. And Other Things (1968)
- Early in the Morning (1970)

==== Compilation albums ====
- Coming Home (1970)
- Vanity Fare (1981)
- Beach Party (1988)
- Will You Still Love Me Tomorrow (1994)
- The Best of Vanity Fare (2004)
- Hitchin' a Ride (2013)
- I Live for the Sun: Complete Recordings 1966–76 (2015)

=== Singles ===
Year	Single	Peak chart positions										
Year	Single	AUS	CAN	GER	IRE	NL	NZ	SA	SWI	UK	US	US AC
1968	"I Live for the Sun"	76	—	—	—	—	—	—	—	20	—	—
1968	"(I Remember) Summer Morning"	—	—	—	—	—	—	—	—	—	—	—
1969	"Highway of Dreams"	—	—	—	—	—	—	—	—	—	—	—
1969	"Early in the Morning"	25	10	26	15	33	14	—	6	8	12	4
1969	"Hitchin' a Ride"	24	3	—	—	—	—	2	—	16	5	22
1970	"Come Tomorrow"	—	—	—	—	—	—	—	—	—	—	—
1970	"(I Remember) Summer Morning" (US and Canada Release)	—	62	—	—	—	—	—	—	—	98	22
1970	"Carolina's Coming Home"	—	—	—	—	—	—	—	—	—	—	—
1971	"Where Did All the Good Times Go"	—	—	—	—	—	—	—	—	—	—	—
1971	"Better by Far"	—	—	—	—	—	—	—	—	54 (Note: Chart position is from the official UK "Breakers List".)	—	—
1971	"Our Own Way of Living"	—	—	—	—	—	—	—	—	—	—	—
1972	"The Big Parade"	—	—	—	—	—	—	—	—	—	—	—
1972	"I'm in Love with the World"	—	—	—	—	—	—	—	—	—	—	—
1972	"Rock and Roll Is Back"	—	—	—	—	—	—	—	—	—	—	—
1973	"Take It, Shake It, Break My Heart"	—	—	—	—	—	—	—	—	—	—	—
1974	"Fast Running Out of World"	—	—	—	—	—	—	—	—	—	—	—
1977	"Will You Still Love Me Tomorrow"	—	—	—	—	—	—	—	—	—	—	—
1980	"Stay" (EP)	—	—	—	—	—	—	—	—	—	—	—
1986	"Dreamer"	—	—	—	—	—	—	—	—	—	—	—
1993	"Rain"	—	—	—	—	—	—	—	—	—	—	—
"—" denotes releases that did not chart or were not released												

== See also ==
- List of performances on Top of the Pops
