= Gus Jenkins =

American R&B musician (1931–1985)

Augustus D. "Gus" Jenkins (March 24, 1931 – December 22, 1985) was an American blues and R&B pianist, vocalist and bandleader. Credited as Gus Jinkins, he had a no.2 hit on the Billboard R&B chart in 1956 with the instrumental "Tricky". He sometimes used the stage names The Young Wolf, Little Temple, and Piano Bo, and from the late 1960s took the name Jaarone Pharoah.

He was born in Birmingham, Alabama, and developed his piano style influenced by St. Louis blues pianist Walter Davis. He toured with Sammy Green's Hot Harlem Review, and backed singers Big Mama Thornton and Percy Mayfield, before reaching Chicago in the late 1940s. Jenkins first recorded for the Chess label in January 1953, accompanied by Walter Horton (harmonica) and Willie Nix (drums), but his recordings, including "Eight Ball", were not released for some years. He also accompanied David "Honeyboy" Edwards on some of his recordings at Chess. Later in 1953 he recorded "Cold Love" and other tracks as Little Temple for the Specialty label in Los Angeles, with Jimmy Liggins (harmonica), Ted Brinson (bass), and an unknown drummer.

He remained in Los Angeles for the rest of his career, and learned woodworking while continuing to perform, with Johnny Otis' band and others, and record. He recorded "I Miss My Baby" for Jake Porter's Combo label in 1955, before recording "Tricky" in 1956 for the Flash label owned by Charlie Reynolds. The single reached no.2 on the R&B chart and no.79 on the Billboard pop chart in late 1956. He released several further singles on Flash, including "Spark Plug" and "Payday Shuffle", before forming his own label, Pioneer International, with Clayton Metzler in 1959. He released a string of records on the label until 1962, many being piano and organ instrumentals released under his own name, and some featuring vocalist Mamie Perry. He later recorded for the General Artist label, but without further commercial success. However, his single "Chittlins" was released by Tower Records, a subsidiary of Capitol, in 1964.

By 1970, Jenkins had converted to Islam, and used the name Jaarone Pharoah. He continued to perform around Los Angeles, until his death in 1985 at the age of 54.
