= Innocent bystander =

Innocent Bystander may refer to:

== Films and television ==
- Innocent Bystander (film), a 1972 film directed by Peter Collinson
- There Are No Innocent Bystanders, a documentary about The Libertines

== Music ==
- Innocent Bystander (band), a Vancouver-based Canadian band, also part of the Canadian hip hop collective Sweatshop Union
- "Innocent Bystander", a song on Korn's untitled album
- Innocent Bystanders, a Perth-based Australian band
