= Shoulder surfing (surfing) =

Surfing term

In surfing, shoulder surfing (also known as shoulder hopping) is getting on a wave where another surfer is already riding. It is seen as poor etiquette.

== Background ==
Shoulder hoppers do not take off on the critical part of the wave where there is a need for a high level of skill, but take off further down the line. They are often regarded as annoying by more experienced surfers because shoulder hoppers will sometimes drop in on a surfer already riding the wave – which breaches surfing etiquette of "first on wave (or, closest to the curl) has right of way". Southern California early eighties band the Surf Punks performed a song called Shoulder Hopper for their album My Beach.
