= Andria (disambiguation) =

Andria is an Italian city in the Province of Barletta-Andria-Trani.

Andria may also refer to:

== Literature ==
- Andria (comedy) or The Girl from Andros, a Roman comedy by Terence
- Andria (Machiavelli), a play by Niccolò Machiavelli, translated from Terence's

== Other uses ==
- Andria (name), a given name or surname
- Roman Catholic Diocese of Andria, a Roman Catholic diocese
- "Andria", a song by La Dispute from their 2008 album Somewhere at the Bottom of the River Between Vega and Altair
