= Caroline, No =

1966 song by Brian Wilson and the Beach Boys

- Sea of Tunes sheet music cover

Single by Brian Wilson

from the album Pet Sounds
- B-side: "Summer Means New Love"
- Released: March 7, 1966
- Recorded: January 31 – c. February 9, 1966
- Studio: Western, Hollywood
- Genre: Pop rock; jazz
- Length: 2:51
- Label: Capitol
- Songwriters: Brian Wilson; Tony Asher
- Producer: Brian Wilson

Brian Wilson singles chronology
| "Caroline, No" (1966) | "Gettin' Hungry" (1967) |

Licensed audio
- "Caroline, No" on YouTube

Audio sample
- file; help

"Caroline, No" (sometimes titled "Caroline No") is a song by the American musician Brian Wilson that was released as his first solo record on March 7, 1966 and, two months later, included as the closing track on the Beach Boys' album Pet Sounds. Written with Tony Asher, the lyrics describe a disillusioned man who reflects on his former love interest and the pain of someone changing. Musically, it is distinguished for its jazz chords and unusual combination of instruments, including bass flutes, 12-string electric guitar, and muted harpsichord.

The words were inspired by a past girlfriend of Asher's named Carol Amen. He initially conceived the title phrase as "Carol, I Know", misheard by Wilson as "Caroline, No". Other reports, which Wilson disputed, variously suggest that the song was written about himself, his former schoolmate Carol Mountain, or his then-wife Marilyn. Asher credited the impetus for the song partly to Wilson's disenchantment with his music career and with "sweet little girls" who grow up into "bitchy hardened adults".

Wilson produced the track in early 1966 at Western Studio with 12 session musicians who variously played harpsichord, flutes, guitars, basses, and vibraphone. Some of the percussion involved an empty water cooler jug struck from the bottom with a mallet. Wilson sped up the mix by one semitone to make his voice sound younger. The album version was edited to include a non-musical tag consisting of the sounds of Wilson's dogs barking and a passing train.

"Caroline, No", issued with the B-side "Summer Means New Love", peaked at number 32 in the US and failed to chart in the UK. To mitigate the poor sales, Capitol quickly issued "Sloop John B" as the Beach Boys' next single. Wilson later cited "Caroline, No" as his favorite track on Pet Sounds and among the finest songs he ever wrote. In 2004, it was ranked number 214 in Rolling Stone's list of "The 500 Greatest Songs of All Time".

== Background and lyrics ==
"Caroline, No" was written by Brian Wilson and Tony Asher, possibly within a few days of writing "Wouldn't It Be Nice". Although Wilson claimed that Asher only provided the words to his music, Asher credited himself with contributing musical ideas to at least three songs on Pet Sounds, including "Caroline, No". (Note: The other two were "That's Not Me" and "I Just Wasn't Made for These Times".) He credited Wilson with the subject matter, however, as "he'd always wanted to write a song about lost innocence, a young girl who changes as she matures and somehow, something's lost." Wilson's 2016 memoir describes "Caroline, No" both as "a new song [Tony had been] working on" and a song on which Wilson "wrote the music". His 1991 memoir says that after discussing the proposed lyric theme, Asher "took a tape home, embellished on my concept, and completed the words."

Asher initially conceived the title phrase as "Carol, I Know". When spoken, however, Wilson heard this as "Caroline, No". After the confusion was resolved, the pair decided to keep the new title, feeling that it had brought an especially poignant quality to the song.

["Caroline No"] is a story about how, once you've fucked up or once you've run your gamut with a chick, there's no way to get it back. It takes a lot of courage to do that sometimes in your life. ... I just felt sad, so I wrote a sad song.

— Brian Wilson, 1989

The lyrics describe a man who reflects on his former love interest and the loss of her innocence, asking, "Where did your long hair go? Where is the girl I used to know? How could you lose that happy glow?" At the end of the song, the singer asks if they could ever work together to bring back "the things that made me love you so much then", before pleading, "Oh, Caroline, no".

Wilson commented, "[The lyrics are] a real tear jerker, very like 'Hey Girl' [a 1963 record] by Freddie Scott." Musicologist Philip Lambert identified "Caroline, No" as a continuation of the themes previously established in Wilson's "You Still Believe in Me" and "The Little Girl I Once Knew". In his description, the protagonist is "thoroughly heartbroken and disillusioned" and "longs for a return to the youthful innocence, not the complexity of childhood – 'Wouldn't It Be Nice' in reverse." Granata offered that the "ruminating tune" represented "the antithesis" of most Beach Boys hits.

Music historian Charles Granata writes that the line "Caroline, why?" suggests that the protagonist is unsure "why the relationship has ended. ... He doesn't blame her, but he muses and frets over a flood of unanswered questions". Author James Perone differs in his interpretation, "the blame for the end of the relationship [is placed] on his partner; she is the one who changed, not him.

== Inspiration ==
Like their other collaborations, "Caroline, No" was based on the songwriters' real-life experiences. According to Asher, the discussions that led to the song had revolved around "how wonderful it is when you first meet a girl and she looks great, and how terrible it is when you know you'll be breaking up at any moment." He said that it was originally a happier song, but Wilson moved it into a sadder direction because Wilson "was saddened to see how sweet little girls turned out to be kind of bitchy hardened adults."

=== Carol Mountain ===
Brian's brother Dennis stated in a 1976 interview that "Caroline, No" was "about a girl that Brian was really in love with in high school. He saw her again years later, and it all came back to him, and he wrote the song." Brian's 1991 memoir supports that the song had derived from his past infatuation with a high school classmate named Carol Mountain. He writes,

I'd reminisced to Tony about my high school crush on Carol Mountain and sighed, "If I saw her today, I'd probably think, God, she's lost something, because growing up does that to people." But the song was most influenced by the changes [my first wife] Marilyn and I had gone through. We were young, Marilyn nearing twenty [sic] and me closing in on twenty-four, yet I thought we'd lost the innocence of our youth in the heavy seriousness of our lives.

Asked about the song in a 1996 interview, Marilyn said that she had not heard "too much of it" until the track was recorded and Wilson had brought an acetate home. She acknowledged that the song had been difficult to listen to, as she was aware that Wilson's "first crush was for a girl named Carol." Marilyn went on to say that Brian "constantly remembers his past and still relates to it and everybody in it. And that's another thing at seventeen years old that was hard for me to understand. You want this man to talk about you, and he was talking about all his old girlfriends."

In the autumn of 1966, months after the release of Pet Sounds, Wilson attempted to reconnect with Mountain, acting on the suggestion of friend Stanley Shapiro. According to Shapiro, Wilson had phoned every person named Mountain listed in the Hawthorne-Inglewood area until he found her parents, who gave Wilson her address. Wilson then drove with Shapiro to Mountain's house, intending to bring her to his home on Laurel Way, but was unsuccessful in the endeavor. (Note: Shapiro said, "It was the funniest thing I had ever seen in my life. We were bombed out of our minds. He's standing on the doorstep ringing her doorbell and Carol Mountain opened the door with rollers in her hair." Mountain refused to leave with Wilson, and her husband threatened to retrieve his gun, prompting Wilson and Shapiro to flee. Wilson continued to telephone Mountain following this incident. She recalled, "He didn't sound drugged or anything, but it was very strange. He'd call at 3:00 a.m. and want to talk about music. I was such a nerd I'd say, 'What? Who?' and have him talk to my husband. But it was nothing inappropriate.")

=== Other reports ===
Marilyn said of her reaction to the lyrics, "I thought it was about me, because I had cut my hair. ... [Brian] always used to talk about how long hair keeps a girl feminine." In a 1994 interview, Wilson credited that particular line to Asher, who "must have known a girl who cut her hair off".

Asher confirmed that his lyrics had been inspired by a former high school girlfriend, named Carol Amen, who had moved to New York to become a Broadway dancer. He said, "When I went east to visit her a scant year after the move, she had changed radically. Yes, she had cut her hair. But she was a far more worldly person, not all for the worse." Contradicting the account taken from Wilson's memoir, Asher recalled that he had not been told about Mountain when composing "Caroline, No".

In a 2005 interview, Wilson said that the song "wasn't written about anyone. I just used the name Caroline." Bruce Johnston similarly denied that "Caroline" was a real person and said that the song was actually "directly about Brian himself and the death of a quality within him that was so vital. His innocence. He knows it too." (Note: Wilson's 2016 memoir says that the song was "sort of about Marilyn, but, as time went on, sort of also about me. ... I know Tony didn’t write it that way".) Asher supported that another impetus for the song was "Brian's wish that he could go back to simpler days, his wish that the group could return to the days when the whole thing was a lot of fun and very little pressure." He told biographer David Leaf that Wilson also had in mind "sweet little girls ... and his wife's sister".

== Composition ==
"Caroline, No" contains an AABA form and an ambiguous tonal center. The latter recalls the technique used in "God Only Knows" but differs by not implying a single key as strongly as "Don't Talk (Put Your Head on My Shoulder)". Most of "Caroline, No" is closest to the key of D♭ major, while other portions suggest G♭ major or B♭ minor. None of the chords are simple (major or minor) triads. The verses alternate between A♭Madd6 (or Fm^{6}_{5}) and E♭m^{4}_{2} until the end of the section, with the appearance of a G♭ major chord (first as G♭M9^{6}_{4} and then as G♭M9) that gives the piece a brief sense of tonal stability, but which pivots to the newly-tonicized D♭ bridge.

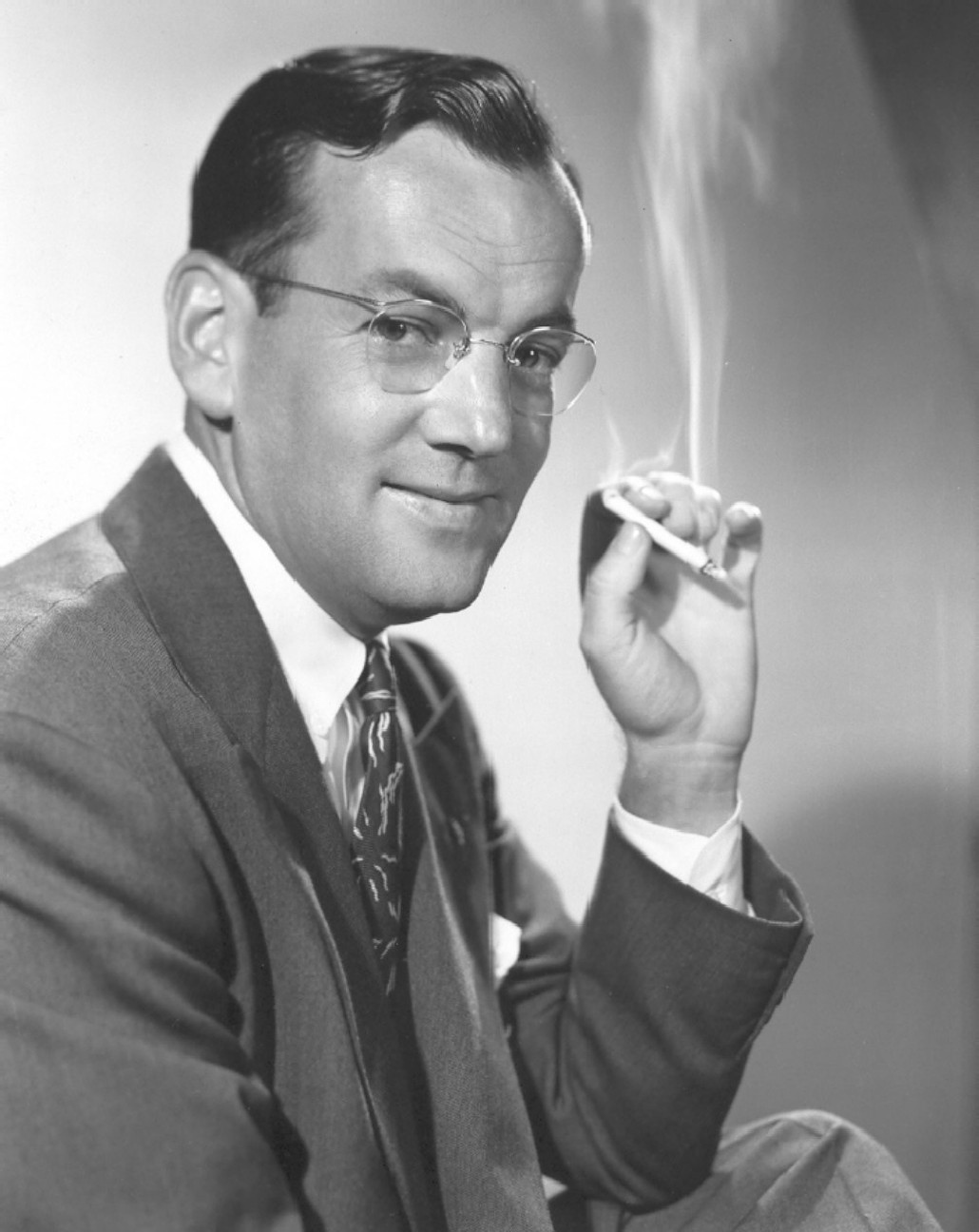
Wilson compared "Caroline, No" to the music of Glenn Miller (pictured)

It is one of only two tracks on Pet Sounds with just one vocal part (the other being "Don't Talk"). The instrumentation features harpsichord and bass flutes combined with more typical pop rock instrumentation, creating a sound that, in Lambert's estimation, reflects a jazz influence. Jim Fusilli, author of the 33 1/3 book on the album, concurred that "In many ways it's a jazz tune. Some of those chords are jazz chords." Wilson said of the bridge, "The melody and the chords were like Glenn Miller ... a Glenn Miller-type bridge." Asher said that he had implored Wilson to incorporate the bass flute.

In discussing the melody, Lambert distinguishes subtle shifts in pitch similar to a musical motif that has lost its energy. The melody primarily oscillates between the notes F and G♭ at the start and end of verses, with these notes playing a significant role in the bridge's melody. In the bridge, specific notes (G♭, F, and F♯) are highlighted to underscore certain words like "heart," "cry," "sad," and "why". The song concludes with a flute and bass flute duet, in octaves, echoing the verse's melody without bringing the piece to a traditional resolution. In Lambert's view, this leaves the listener with "no sense of closure or resolution." Wilson commented, "The fade-out was like a 1944 kind of record ... Listen for the flutes in the fadeout."

Perone observed that while the melody engages in "wide tessitura changes and wide melodic intervals, it is the largely the instrumentation that makes 'Caroline, No' sound completely unlike recordings by other major pop artists in 1966." Granata referred to the arrangement as Wilson's "instrumental pinnacle" and cited the percussion as playing "a key role in extending the breezy feel of the performance", although "it's the flutes and [saxophone] that really make the difference, infusing the melody with an enchanting glow."

== Production ==
=== Single recording ===
Something must have happened to Brian. I can remember he looked so sad. When he'd catch me checking out his face, he'd look back at me with a kind of deep, unexplainable sad look. I had never seen him like that before. He was happy with the music, though. It seemed to be his expression of some feeling he couldn't put into words. Not much of a tune, just a mood.

— Studio musician Carol Kaye, recalling the "Caroline, No" session date

"Caroline, No" was recorded on January 31, 1966 at Western Studio in Hollywood. The basic track was recorded with 12 musicians who variously played guitars, bass, flutes, and percussion. Earlier takes featured an instrumental introduction before Wilson opted for the final arrangement: an empty Sparkletts water cooler jug struck from the bottom with a hard percussion mallet. 17 takes were required, after which Wilson recorded a lead vocal and further instrumentation. Like "You Still Believe in Me", his vocal was doubletracked "live-to-tape" as engineer Chuck Britz mixed the mono master on or before February 9.

It is often reported that "Caroline, No" does not feature additional vocals from Wilson's bandmates because they were away on a tour and he was in a hurry to complete the record. According to biographer Mark Dillon, the relevant documentation suggests that the members were available for recording and could have contributed to the song if Wilson had wished. Asher remembered that he never had the impression of it being a Beach Boys song. Unlike the pair's other collaborations, Wilson never demonstrated on piano the vocal parts that his bandmates would sing.

During the mastering process, Wilson sped up the track by a semi-tone, following the advice of his father Murry, who thought that the vocal would benefit from sounding younger. In doing so, the song's tempo increased by 6% while the key was raised from C to C♯.

=== Album tag ===
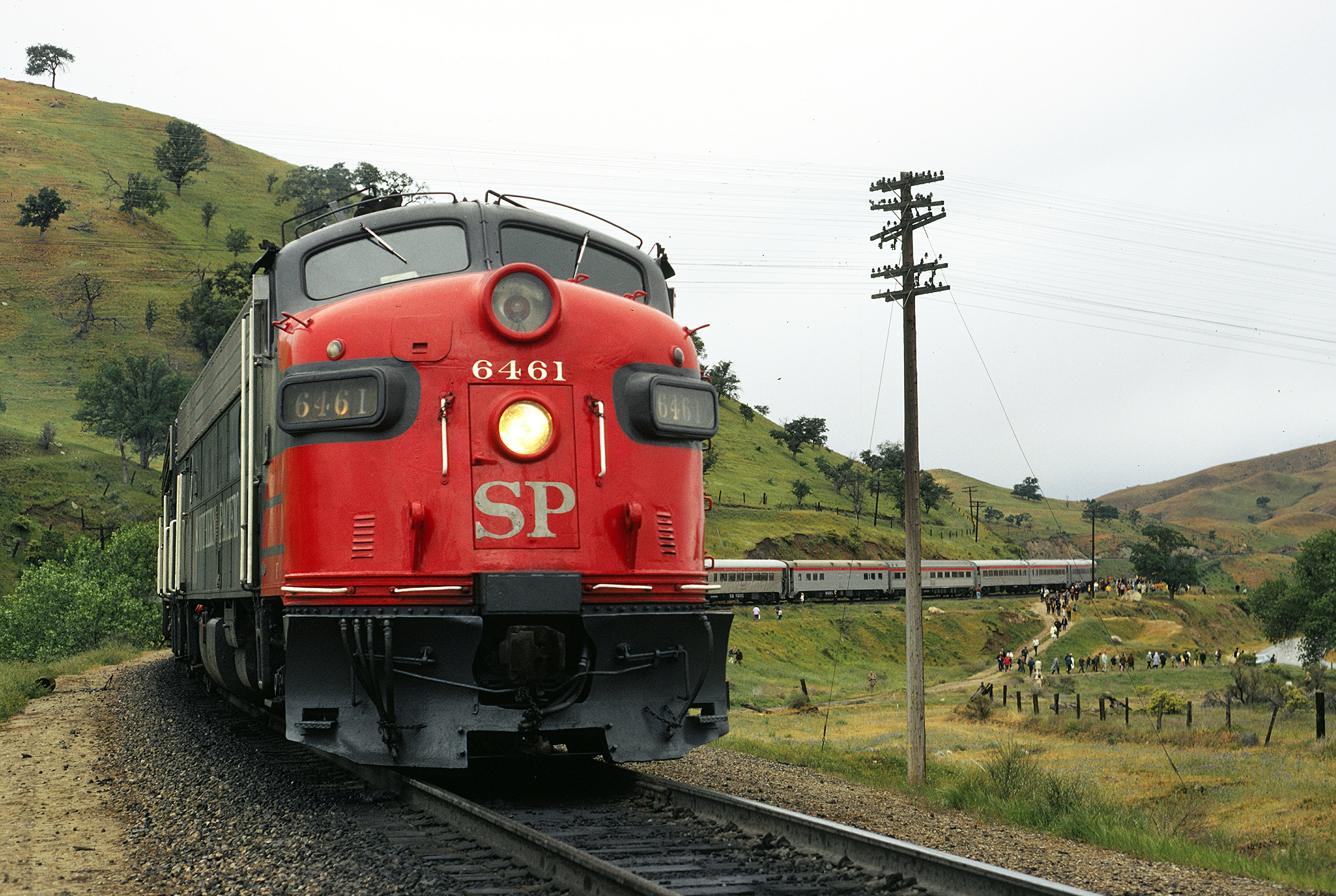
The Owl, otherwise known as the train heard after "Caroline, No"

Wilson wanted to end Pet Sounds with a non-musical tag to follow "Caroline, No". On March 22, he returned to Western to capture the barking of his dogs Banana, a beagle, and Louie, a Weimaraner. A taped conversation from the session reveals that Wilson considered photographing a horse belonging to Carl in Western Studio 3 for the album cover. Wilson asked Britz, "Hey, Chuck, is it possible we can bring a horse in here without ... if we don't screw everything up?" and Britz responded, "I beg your pardon?" before Wilson said, "Honest to God, now, the horse is tame and everything!" Wilson's dogs inspired the album's title.

As the album version of "Caroline, No" fades out, it segues into the sounds of Wilson's barking dogs and a passing locomotive train sampled from the 1963 effects album Mister D's Machine ("Train #58, the Owl at Edison, California"). The Owl (SP 6461) was a Southern Pacific Railroad train that ran an overnight route between San Francisco and Los Angeles from 1898 to 1965. Its horn sounds a B♭7 trichord that transforms into a G7 (a consequence of the Doppler effect) as it approaches a railway crossing. Musicologist Daniel Harrison wrote, "There's no little irony that this effect was put on record by a group noted for their songs about cars."

Granata, writing in his 2003 book about Pet Sounds, reported that "no one remembers" why Wilson chose to end the album as he did. Asked in a 1996 interview, Wilson said, "I'm not really sure [what I had in mind]. I can't answer that question. ... I took a tape recorder and I recorded their barks. And we went down and we looked through some sound effects tapes and we found a train. So we just put it all together." Edwin Pouncey of The Wire describes the "atmospheric, evocative and lonesome-sounding" album tag as one of several notable "pop and rock musique concrète flirtations" from the period, while Adam Webb of BBC Music deems it a "forlorn soundtrack".

== Release ==
On March 7, 1966, "Caroline, No" (backed with the Summer Days instrumental "Summer Means New Love") was issued by Capitol Records as Wilson's first solo record. According to music historian Keith Badman, "everyone close to [Brian was] certain the disc [would] be a monster hit." In Marilyn's recollection, "Everybody at Capitol said it should be a single because it was so good, and there were no background vocals, so they said, 'Why don't we release this as a Brian Wilson single, because it's really not a Beach Boys song."

Conversely, biographer Steven Gaines wrote that Capitol "knew it was not a hit" but released the song "to encourage Brian to complete the forthcoming album." Asher recalled that the criticism Wilson received from his bandmates about the song not being "Beach Boys" enough was what prompted him to issue the single under his own name. Session musician Steve Douglas told an interviewer that he had been "really instigating" Wilson to issue the single as a solo record, a decision that ultimately "caused problems, man, I just can't tell you."

To promote the single, Brian, Carl Wilson, Love, and Johnston recorded several 23-second "thank you" radio spots for different stations across the U.S., thanking them for playing the record and making it "a hit". The single debuted on the Billboard Hot 100 at number 37, more than a month after it was released, and ultimately peaked at number 32 during its seven weeks on the chart. Badman states that Capitol quickly issued "Sloop John B" as a single "to cover up the unimpressive performance" of "Caroline, No". In the UK, "Caroline, No" was issued in April and failed to chart.

Wilson was asked in 2001 if he would have issued Pet Sounds as a solo album had the single performed better, to which he responded, "Probably would've, yeah, but I didn't." Asked again in 2009, however, he said, "No, I just wanted to do that one. 'Caroline No' fit my voice more than the other guys ..."

== Critical reception ==
Pet Sounds was released on May 16 with "Caroline, No" as its final track. In his self-described "unbiased" review of the album for Record Mirror, Norman Jopling praised the song as the LP's best track, "Very sad and very romantic. In fact horribly sad." However, he decreed that the added sound effects ruined "an atmosphere which must have taken some amount of time and trouble to create. A pity because Beach Boy fans won't thank them for that kind of musical development." Cash Box described the song as a "tender, slow-moving gentle ode about an unhappy fella who desperately wants to get back with his ex-gal." Billboard called it an "easy go emotional ballad with strong back beat" that "has all the ingredients of a No. 1 smash."

Among retrospective assessments, journalist Nick Kent in 1975 recognized "Caroline, No" as "arguably the most beautiful song [Brian] has ever written." In 2001, "Caroline, No" was ranked number 55 in Rock's Backpages' list of "The 100 Most Heartbreaking Records of All Time". In 2004, it was ranked number 211 in Rolling Stone's list of "The 500 Greatest Songs of All Time".

Wilson himself stated that "Caroline, No" was his favorite Pet Sounds track, "the prettiest ballad I've ever sung. Awfully pretty song." In a 1995 interview, he viewed it as "probably the best [song] I've ever written." Dennis said that their father Murry "used to go to pieces when he heard stuff like 'Caroline, No.'" Asher opined, "At first, I didn't think it was on the same level as the other songs we were doing, although I liked it well enough. It just didn't have the level of sophistication that the other songs had."

== Legacy and rerecorded versions ==
Wilson revisited the themes of "Caroline, No" in his 1988 song "Baby Let Your Hair Grow Long" from his first solo album Brian Wilson. Biographer Peter Ames Carlin wrote that it "updated the mournful first line of 'Caroline, No' ... only with the voice of a seasoned veteran who knows that innocence and hope can be regained." Wilson also rerecorded "Caroline, No" for his 1995 album I Just Wasn't Made for These Times.

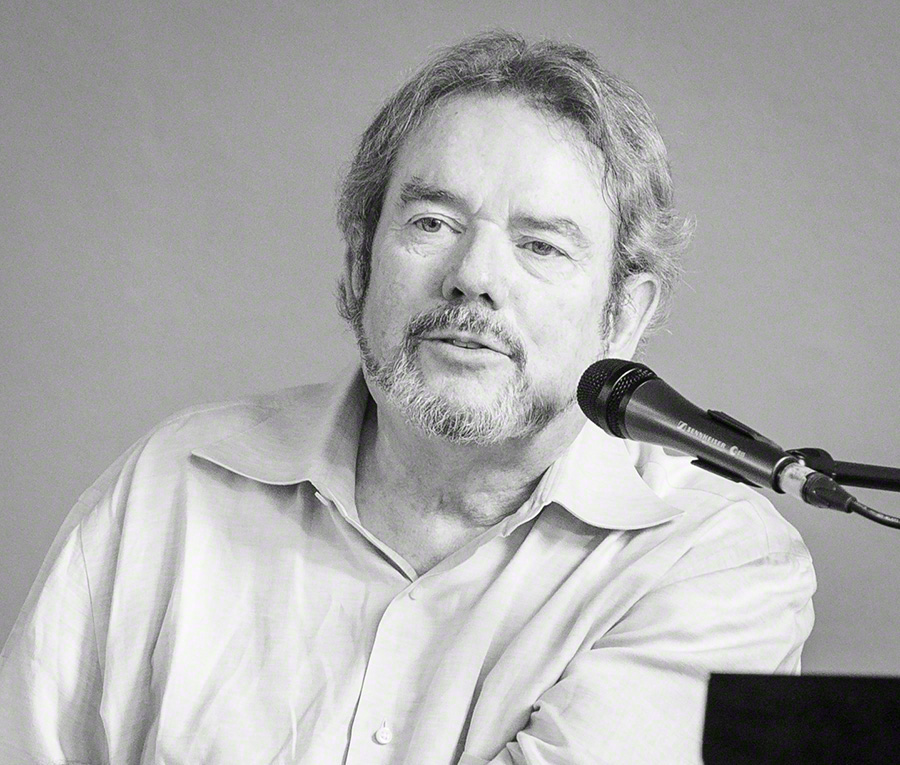
Jimmy Webb contributed an orchestral arrangement to the Beach Boys' 1996 rerecording of "Caroline, No"

The Beach Boys, accompanied by Timothy B. Schmit, remade the song with a new multi-part vocal arrangement for the 1996 album Stars and Stripes Vol. 1. Jimmy Webb was commissioned to write the orchestration for the track. Dillon praised the rendition as "the highlight" of the album.

== In popular culture ==
- It is sometimes suggested that the animal sound effects inspired a similar device in the Beatles' 1967 song "Good Morning, Good Morning".
- The 2014 biopic Love & Mercy includes a depiction of the recording of "Caroline, No" and its dog barking session.

== Personnel ==
Per band archivist Craig Slowinski.

- Brian Wilson – lead vocal; producer

Session musicians

- Hal Blaine – Sparkletts water jug, overdubbed drums
- Frank Capp – vibraphone
- Carol Kaye – 12-string electric guitar, overdubbed Danelectro 6-string bass
- Glen Campbell – 12-string electric guitar
- Steve Douglas – woodblock on tambourine, overdubbed alto or tenor saxophone
- Barney Kessel – acoustic guitar
- Lyle Ritz – double bass
- Al De Lory – harpsichord with lute stop
- Bill Green– flute and bass flute
- Jim Horn – alto flute
- Plas Johnson – alto flute
- Jay Migliori – bass flute

Guests

- Banana and Louie – barking (album version)

Technical staff

- Chuck Britz – engineer

== Charts ==
Weekly charts
| Chart (1966) | Peak position |
|---|---|
| Canada RPM 100 | 16 |
| U.S. Billboard Hot 100 | 32 |
| U.S. Cash Box Top 100 | 38 |

== Bibliography ==
- Badman, Keith (2004). The Beach Boys: The Definitive Diary of America's Greatest Band, on Stage and in the Studio. Backbeat Books. ISBN 978-0-87930-818-6.
- Carlin, Peter Ames (2006). Catch a Wave: The Rise, Fall, and Redemption of the Beach Boys' Brian Wilson. Rodale. ISBN 978-1-59486-320-2.
- Dillon, Mark (2012). Fifty Sides of the Beach Boys: The Songs That Tell Their Story. ECW Press. ISBN 978-1-77090-198-8.
- Gaines, Steven (1986). Heroes and Villains: The True Story of The Beach Boys. New York: Da Capo Press. ISBN 0306806479.
- Granata, Charles L. (2003). Wouldn't It Be Nice: Brian Wilson and the Making of the Beach Boys' Pet Sounds. A Cappella Books. ISBN 9781556525070.
- Harrison, Daniel (2016). "Pet Sound Effects". In Lambert, Philip (ed.). Good Vibrations: Brian Wilson and the Beach Boys in Critical Perspective. University of Michigan Press. ISBN 978-0-472-11995-0.
- Lambert, Philip (2007). Inside the Music of Brian Wilson: the Songs, Sounds, and Influences of the Beach Boys' Founding Genius. Continuum. ISBN 978-0-8264-1876-0.
- Lambert, Philip (March 2008). "Brian Wilson's Pet Sounds". Twentieth-Century Music. 5 (1). Cambridge University Press: 109–133. doi:10.1017/S1478572208000625. S2CID 162871617. Archived from the original on 2021-10-02.
- Leaf, David (1978). The Beach Boys and the California Myth. Grosset & Dunlap. ISBN 978-0-448-14626-3.
- O'Regan, Jody (2014). When I Grow Up: The Development of the Beach Boys' Sound (1962-1966) (PDF) (Thesis). Queensland Conservatorium. doi:10.25904/1912/2556.
- Perone, James E. (2012). "The Beach Boys". The Album: A Guide to Pop Music's Most Provocative, Influential, and Important Creations. ABC-CLIO. ISBN 978-0-313-37907-9.
- Sanchez, Luis (2014). The Beach Boys' Smile. Bloomsbury Publishing. ISBN 978-1-62356-956-3.
- Wilson, Brian; Gold, Todd (1991). Wouldn't It Be Nice: My Own Story. HarperCollins. ISBN 978-0-06-018313-4.
- Wilson, Brian; Greenman, Ben (2016). I Am Brian Wilson: A Memoir. Da Capo Press. ISBN 978-0-306-82307-7.
