= Paul Heussenstamm =

American painter (born 1949)

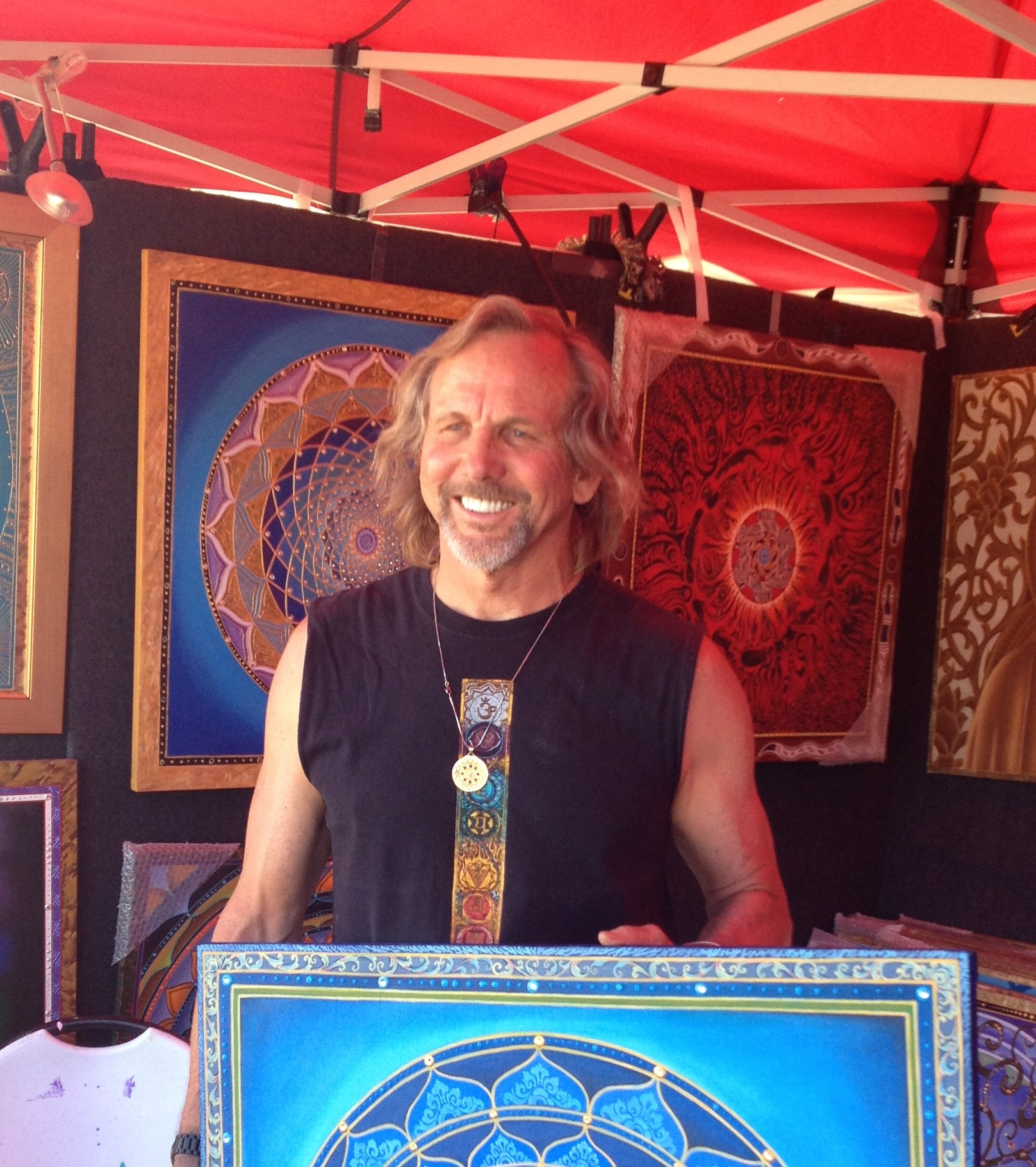
- Born: September 14, 1949 (age 76); Los Angeles, California, U.S.
- Occupations: Painter, Teacher
- Website: www.mandalas.com

Paul Heussenstamm (born September 14, 1949) is an American painter and lecturer. He began painting full-time at the age of 26. He conducts "Art as a Spiritual Path" workshops. Heussenstamm's work has been featured in Unity in Chicago, Illinois; Agape in Santa Monica; and Church of Religious Science, Santa Barbara; His art is also featured at Deepak Chopra’s in La Jolla, California; Esalen, in Big Sur, California; and Oglethorpe University Museum in Atlanta, Georgia.

== Bio ==
Paul Heussenstamm is the son of the artist and writer, Karl Heussenstamm, and artist and psychologist, Frances Heussenstamm. The household consistently engaged in spiritual discussion with notable guests such as Sufi Master Pir Inayat Khan, actor Gig Young, transcendental painter Emil Bisttram, and health guru Gypsy Boots.

Heussenstamm's brothers, Mark and John Heussenstamm all lead lives as artists.

Though originally aspiring to be a plein air painter, Heussenstamm's spiritual and artistic journey led him from landscape paintings, to flower paintings, and on to discovering his passion for mandala paintings. His first mandala was painted at a spiritual workshop conducted by Brugh Joy with notable participants such as Barbra Streisand and Carrie Fisher. He was introduced to the healing potential of mandalas through the work and mentorship of Beverly Sheiffer. With permission, he adopted her method of painting mandalas for spiritual revitalization. Heussenstamm has continued to receive patronage for his mandala paintings throughout his journey.

== Books ==
Heussenstamm authored the book, Divine Forces: Art that Awakens the Soul. He also coauthored several books: Color Yourself Calm: A Mindfulness Coloring Book; The Art of Mandala Meditation: Mandala Designs to Heal Your Mind; and Body and Spirit Mandala Masterworks: Beauty. Stillness. Presence.
