= Surf Punks =

Pop punk band

- Origin: Malibu, California, U.S.
- Genres: Surf rock, pop punk
- Years active: 1977-1989
- Labels: Epic, Engima, Shelter, Day-Glo, Restless
- Past members: Dennis Dragon; Drew Steele; Mark "The Shark" Miller; Andrew Jackson; Jerry Weber; Kevin Roberts; Tony "Hulk" Creed; John Hunt; John Heussenstamm; Scott Goddard; Jeff "Ray Ban" Eyrich

The Surf Punks were a pop punk band formed in 1977 by Malibu residents Dennis Dragon (1947–2017) and Drew Steele (d. October 2021). Dragon was the son of symphony conductor Carmen Dragon and the brother of Captain & Tennille's Daryl Dragon, who had previously drummed with the Byrds and the Beach Boys. Steele's stepfather was Gavin MacLeod of McHale's Navy, The Mary Tyler Moore Show and Love Boat fame. Dragon recruited the additional talents of Malibu residents Tony Creed AKA the "Hulk", for lead guitar and blues harp, fellow bodysurfer/frisbeeist John Hunt on the bass, and South Bay resident John Heussenstamm for lead guitar. This was the original core group, produced and engineered by Dragon in his garage studio across the street from Zuma Beach, his favorite body surfing spot. Mark Miller joined them on "Locals Only." Jeff "Ray Ban" Eyrich joined the Surf Punks on bass when John Hunt left the group.

Scott Goddard (1952–2006) later joined as lead vocalist on a few songs.

== Career ==
Record producer and then Malibu resident Denny Cordell saw merit in the group and released their first recordings on a single, "My Beach" b/w "My Wave", in Australia on Shelter Records. Their subsequent first album, an independent release on their own label, Day Glo Records, garnered them enough airplay on the then fledgling L.A. alternative radio station KROQ-FM to lead to a re-release of the album on Epic Records in 1980, and the release of two further albums, Locals Only and Oh No, Not Them Again on Enigma Records, with Mark Miller, keyboard player Jerry Weber and lifeguard/guitarist Andy Jackson.

Dragon and Hulk also provided the theme song to KLOS disc jockey Frazer Smith's signature show bumper, "Cool Patrol". Heavy rotation on KROQ-FM was largely responsible for the band selling out their first live performance ever at the Santa Monica Civic Auditorium. The Surf Punks were road managed from 1980 to 1983 by Michael Parenti (the artist, not the political writer), who also provided many of the T-shirt designs for the band. At one time, rock legend Johnny Rivers showed interest in the band by co-producing with Dragon a single titled "Surfs Up Medley", released on his own Soul City label. TV producer Chris Bearde also managed the band for a short time and tried with movie producer Brian Grazer and Rivers to procure a Hollywood movie deal for the band.

The live shows of the Surf Punks, in the heyday of the punk explosion in L.A., were full of wild abandon. High points of the show were "I Can't Get a Tan" and "Big Top".

The lyrics of the band centered primarily on the in-group/out-group experiences of "locals" (surfers living on the beach in Malibu) and "vals" (commuters from the San Fernando Valley to the private and public beaches of the exclusive Malibu Beach community). Never truly "punk" in the traditional sense of the word, the Surf Punks were sort of a "Beach Boys of the punk world," offering their take on the "turf wars" over the southern California beaches and its waves.

The band made at least five music videos: "My Beach", "Big Top", "Welcome to California", "Shark Attack" and another for their cover of "Come on-a My House", which was originally a hit for Rosemary Clooney. They also appeared in the 1988 film Under the Boardwalk.

== Discography ==
- Surf Punks (1979)
- My Beach (1980) distributed by CBS Records, contains a cover of The Sunrays' I Live for the Sun retitled "We All Live For The Sun", featuring a dulcimer solo. Mastered at Artisan Sound Recorders by Greg Fulginiti
- Locals Only (1982; reissued with bonus tracks 2013)
- Oh No! Not Them Again (1988; reissued 2007)
- Party Bomb (1988; reissued 2007)
