= I Live for the Sun =

Single by the Sunrays

from the album Andrea
- B-side: "Bye Baby Bye"
- Released: July 1965
- Recorded: January 10, 1965
- Genre: Pop
- Length: 2:26
- Label: Tower
- Songwriter: Rick Henn
- Producer: Murry Wilson

The Sunrays singles chronology
"Outta Gas" (1964)	"I Live for the Sun" (1965)	"Andrea" (1965)

"I Live for the Sun" is song by the American pop band the Sunrays. Written by Rick Henn, it was released as a single in 1965.

== Origin and recording ==
Band member Eddy Medora on the origin of the song: "I had a chorus that went, 'Run Run Run' and Ricky Henn called me up to come over and finish it. I didn't come over." Ricky Henn went on to write "I Live For The Sun" but only used the three chords of the chorus of "Run Run Run" and wrote a different melody over those chords, created a new title and concept, new lyrics for the entire song, composed original verses and bridge. The track has an approximate duration of two minutes and twenty-five seconds. The Surf Punks later covered the song at a slightly faster tempo, omitting the bridge but featuring a dulcimer solo in its place.

== Chart performance ==
"I Live for the Sun" reached #51 on the Billboard Hot 100, #20 on the Australian Singles Chart

Chart	Position
Australian Singles Chart	20
UK Singles Chart	20
U.S. Billboard Hot 100	51

== Cover versions ==
- Outside the US, it was also a #20 hit in the UK when covered by Vanity Fare.
- Australian surf music band The Peregians released it as a single in 2021. This version replaces the sung verses with twangy surf guitar.CD Baby release.

== Popular culture ==
- The song gained popularity through the television appearances the group made on a teenage soap opera of the mid-'60s titled Never Too Young. The song's success was arguably a result of positive public response to the group's alternative musical fare and fresh new sound.
- The song appears in the 2014 Beach Boys biopic Love & Mercy during a scene in which Murry Wilson disrupts a recording session for Caroline No with the song, causing friction and panic amongst the group.
