= Bystander Nunatak =

Nunatak in Oates Land, Antarctica

Bystander Nunatak (71°20′S 159°40′E) is a nunatak in New Zealand, 2,435 metres (7,990 ft) high, lying 5 nautical miles (9 km) southwest of Forsythe Bluff, on the west side of Daniels Range in the Usarp Mountains. The name applied by the northern party of the New Zealand Geological Survey Antarctic Expedition, 1963–64, is suggestive of the aspect of this relatively isolated feature.
