= Innocent Bystanders =

Australian rock band

- Origin: Perth, Western Australia, Australia
- Genres: Rock
- Years active: 1983–1988
- Labels: A.I.B Records; Chase Records
- Past members: see Members list

Innocent Bystanders were a Perth based band formed in 1983 featuring vocalist/songwriter Brett Keyser and guitarist Diesel (Mark Lizotte).

== Biography ==
At a time when cover bands dominated the Western Australian music landscape, "Bystanders" were one of the few original acts to make a dent and after a few years of hard work eventually pull very respectable crowds. Their Monday night residences at the Herdsman Hotel drew crowds of over 250 people, many of them music industry types there to listen to this powerful Australian band heavily influenced by Cold Chisel and Bruce Springsteen. The standout features were the depth of Keyser's songwriting and his powerful vocals and the amazing young teenage guitarist Mark Lizotte aka Diesel

The band's songs drew heavily from their local environment of beaches, hot summers, weekends down South and even the demolition of the Scarborough Beach Hotel. In addition Keyser soaked up many influences and ventured into the realm of story-telling with his songs.

In 1983 the band released a cassette entitled Live at the Subi, recorded at the Subiaco Hotel with a mobile recording truck.

In 1984 the band flew to Sydney and recorded their debut single, "Lebanon", with Peter Walker (Midnight Oil and Cold Chisel producer) with the lineup of Mark Lizotte (guitar), Brett Keyser (vocals), John 'Yak' Sherrit (drums), John 'Tatt' Dalzell (bass) and Cliff Kinneen (keyboards). The single reaching #98 on the Australian singles chart.

Innocent Bystanders travelled to Sydney to record their second single, "Dangerous", released in July 1986, which reached #97 on the Australian singles chart. They attracted the attention of hard rockers, The Angels, however Lizotte had already left the band in June 1986 taking Bremond, Dalzell and Sherritt, and they formed Johnny Diesel & the Injectors with George Dalstrom as a second guitarist. Keyser then recruited new players John Heussenstamm (guitar) and Al Kash (drums; ex-Blackfeather) and went on to record the band's first album, Don't Go Looking Back, which was released later in 1986 on the Chase label. reaching #59 on the Australian album charts.

== Members ==
Listed alphabetically:

- Bernie Bremond – saxophone, backing vocals (1983–86)
- John Dalzell – bass guitar (1983–86)
- John Heussenstamm – guitar (1986–89)
- Al Kash – drums (1986–89)
- Brett Keyser – vocals (1983–89)
- Russel Riley – keyboards (1984–89)
- Mark Lizotte – lead guitar, vocals (1983–86)
- Paul Luckas – Piano (1985)
- Jamie Manifis – guitar
- Yak Sherritt – drums (1983–86)
- Dave Skewes – keyboards (1983–84)
- Brett Townshend – saxophone

== Discography ==
=== Studio albums ===
List of albums, with selected chart positions
Title	Album details	Peak chart positions
Title	Album details	AUS
Don't Go Looking Back	Released: September 1986; Format: LP; Label: Chase (CLP8)	59

=== Singles ===
List of singles, with selected chart positions
Year	Title	Peak chart positions
Year	Title	AUS
1984	"Lebanon"/"Young Hearts"	98
1986	"Dangerous"/"I Don’t Care"	97
