= George Heussenstamm =

American composer and academic (1926–2024)

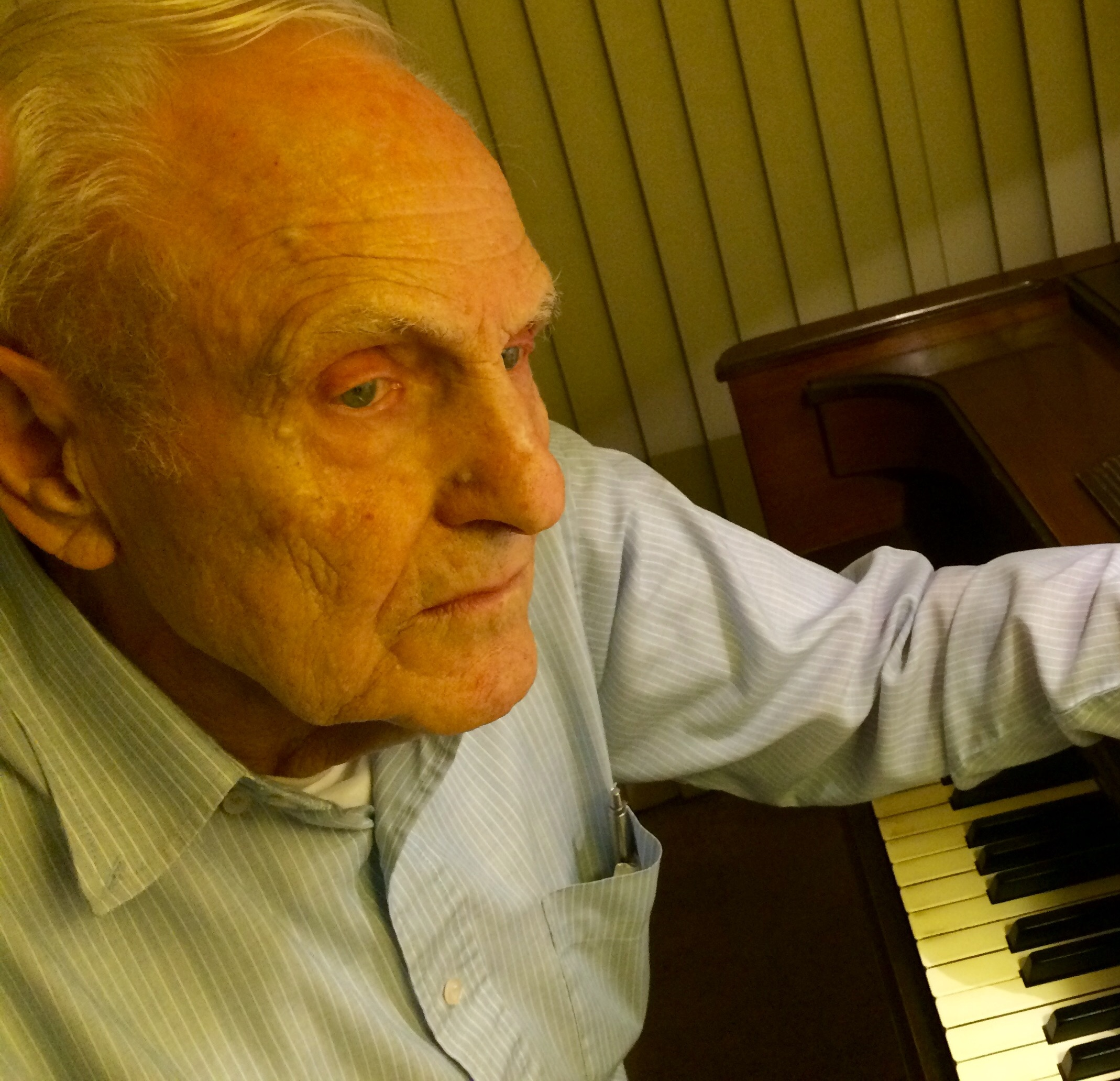
- Born: July 24, 1926; Los Angeles, California, U.S.
- Died: April 8, 2024 (aged 97)
- Occupations: Composer, academic
- Website: www.georgeheussenstamm.com

George Heussenstamm (July 24, 1926 – April 8, 2024) was an American composer. His most well-known works include jazz-classical chamber styles, such as Etudes (7) for oboe, clarinet & bassoon, Op. 77 (1964), Alchemy for solo oboe and tape, Op. 60 (1976), and Ensembles, for brass quintet (1976). Recordings of his compositions include Woodwind Treasures by the West Wind Quintet and Alchemy: American Works for Oboe and English Horn CD by Mark Hill, and others.

Heussenstamm was a professor of music at Cal State Dominguez Hills, Cal State Northridge, Cal State Los Angeles, and other colleges in Southern California. Heussenstamm is the author of several books pertaining to music theory, including The Norton Manual of Music Notation, Hal Leonard Harmony & Theory – Part 1: Diatonic, and Hal Leonard Harmony & Theory – Part 2: Chromatic. The Norton Manual of Music Notation has become a standard of music notation.

Heussenstamm received all of his musical training in the Southern California area. Winner of numerous national and international composition competitions, he is a member of ASCAP, is an honorary member of the international music fraternity, Sigma Alpha Iota, and is a former member of the American Society of University Composers (now called SCI) and the International Society for Contemporary Music. He was a member of NACUSA (National Association of Composers, USA), in which he served as Vice- President for many years. In 1976 and 1981 he was the recipient of Fellowship Grants from the National Endowment for the Arts. Eight of his compositions were recorded on LP and six of these have been committed to CD. From 1971 to 1984 he was Manager of the Coleman Chamber Music Association, the oldest continuing chamber music series in the country.

From 1976, Heussenstamm taught at Cal State Dominguez Hills, Cal State Los Angeles, Ambassador College, and steadily for 17 years at California State University, Northridge, prior to his retirement in June, 2000. Composer of more than 85 published works, he was the author of the book, The Norton Manual of Music Notation, released by W.W. Norton and Co. in March, 1987, and a mainstay in the literature about the notation of music, making Heussenstamm one of the leading authorities in this field. He also wrote a two-volume textbook on tonal harmony, Handbook of Harmony, which was the required harmony textbook at CSUN for several years. It has now been published in two volumes by Hal Leonard Corp. under the title, Hal Leonard Theory and Harmony and is available at book stores everywhere. His Handbook of Tonal Counterpoint, was written in a style geared for maximum comprehension by college-level students.

Composing in a wide spectrum of media, George Heussenstamm's compositions have been performed regularly almost everywhere. He is best known for his large-scale compositions for saxophone and brass ensembles. His final large piece, Moire for strings, is a work of texture and contemporary string technique and was premiered by the University of Southern California Symphony string section in 1990. In 2016, Heussenstamm became the benefactor of a choral music contest thru the California Choral Directors Association (then ACDA California). Heussenstamm funded the CCDA/Heussenstamm Choral Composition Competition for a total of ten years. Due to his donations, California composers are able to attend the CCDA Summer Conference at ECCO for free to have the chance for their winning piece to be read by the entire conference.

Among his non-academic activities were fishing, pocket billiards, going to concerts, and Scrabble. He was for 17 years the director of a Scrabble club in Glendale, California, and was chosen as Director of the Year in 1991 by the National Scrabble Association. He was an avid follower of national and international affairs, his primary source being BBC World Service over XM satellite radio. Married in 1957, his wife, Mary Heussenstamm (1930–2005), was a locally well-known watercolor portraitist. Her book, Watercolor Portraits Painted on the Streets of Los Angeles, has been widely acclaimed.

George Heussenstamm died on April 8, 2024, at the age of 97.
