= John Heussenstamm =

American guitarist and music educator (born 1953)

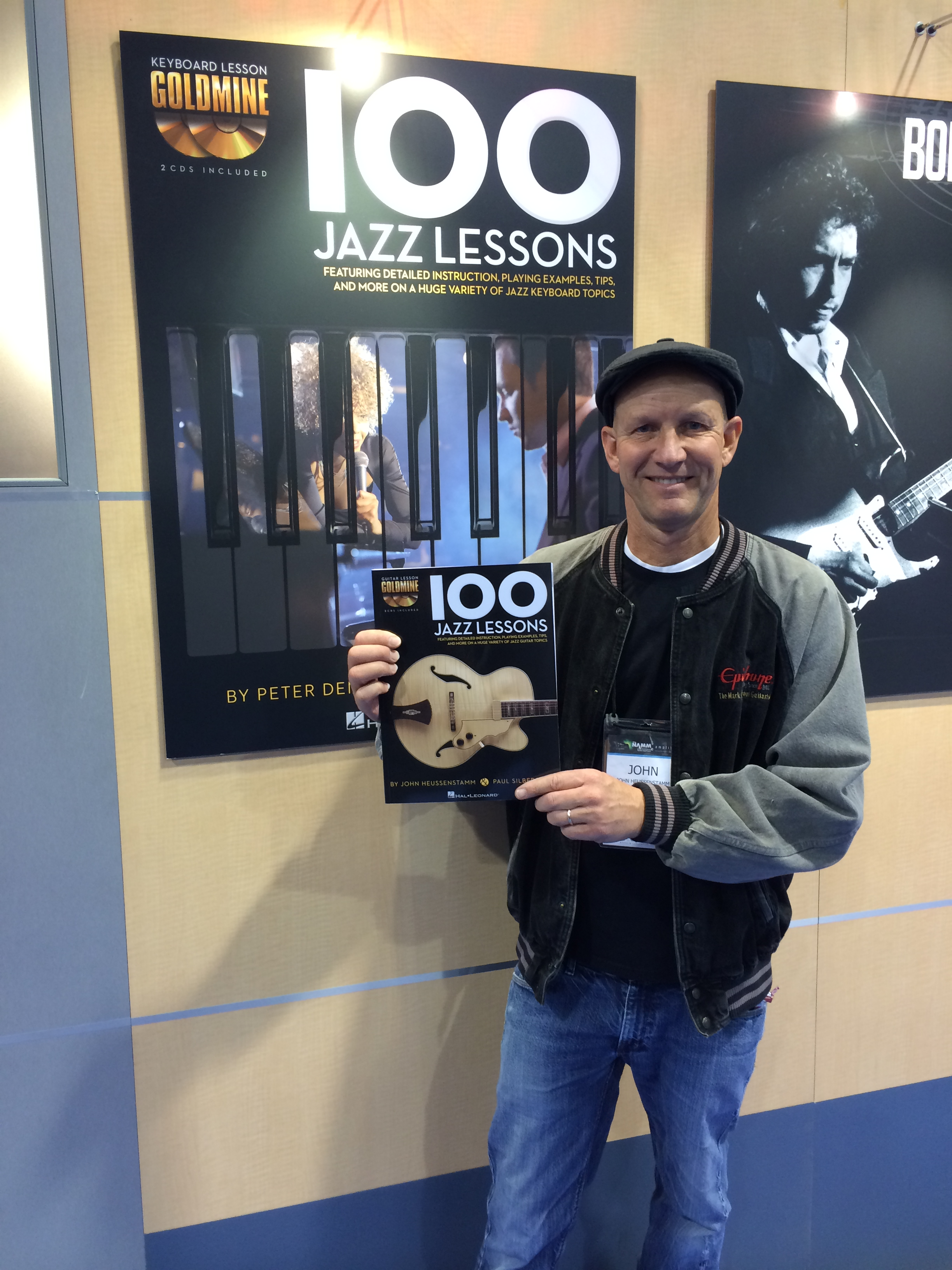
- NAMM Show 2014
- Born: December 28, 1953 (age 72); Los Angeles, CA, United States

John Heussenstamm (born December 28, 1953) is an American guitarist and music educator. He was the original lead guitarist in the Surf Punks, toured with the Deniece Williams Band in 1977, and was a band member of Innocent Bystanders. He is the author of Guitar Workout, a book published by Hal Leonard Corporation in 2010. He is featured as an author and guitarist in The Gold Mine Series, as a coauthor with Chad Johnson in 100 Blues Lessons and with Paul Silbergleit in 100 Jazz Lessons. Heussenstamm was also a featured guitar instructor in three DVDs published by Hal Leonard: 200 Blues Licks, 200 Jazz Licks and 200 Country Licks. His YouTube channel has received over 10 million total hits and has over 15,000 subscribers since 2008. As of February 2015, Heussenstamm resides in Laguna Beach, California.

== Life ==
Heussenstamm is the nephew of composer and music theory professor George Heussenstamm, and the brother of artist Paul Heussenstamm. After high school, he began studying the guitar intensely, leading to a gig in the rhythm and blues group Lovera. He landed a touring gig with the Deniece Williams Band, which opened shows for many other notable acts of the Motown era, such as KC and the Sunshine Band and Earth, Wind & Fire. Under the name "Johnny Malibu", Heussenstamm recorded and performed with the Surf Punks. In the late 1970s, he continued to expand his musical horizons by briefly studying Indian music with Ali Akbar Khan.

From 1980 to 1990, Heussenstamm toured in Australia, mainly in his own bands with names such as the Alligators, the Lifters, Cicada, and the Rent Collectors. He recorded with Innocent Bystanders and independently as John Heussenstamm and the Alligators'. Before returning to the United States, he independently recorded three new age albums, Cloud Hidden, Nameless Wanderer, and Honest Living.

Since the 1990s, Heussenstamm has been teaching, recording, and gigging in the Orange County, California area. In 1992, the LA Times wrote that Heussenstamm was "the most aggressive blues guitar player on the scene today." He recorded many independent projects with artists, such as Thelma Jones and Dennis Lockwood. His underground popularity became apparent when he began posting video guitar lessons on YouTube. This led to his lessons being featured on many instructional websites such as VideoGuitarlessons.com, GuitarInstructor.com, and Premier Guitar. According to the online magazine Guitar International, he has become "a recognized guitar pedagogue, for both his in person lessons" and for his book, Guitar Workout: Speed Picking, Sweeps, Arpeggios and Harmony for the Modern Guitarist, published by Hal Leonard in 2010. This was followed by Heussenstamm being featured in Hal Leonard's The Goldmine Series.

== Awards ==
- Guitar Workout: 3rd Place, 2010 Paul Revere Award
