= Murry Wilson =

American songwriter (1917–1973)

- Wilson, c. 1967
- Born: Murry Gage Wilson; July 2, 1917; Hutchinson, Kansas, U.S.
- Died: June 4, 1973 (aged 55); Whittier, California, U.S.
- Burial place: Inglewood Park Cemetery
- Other name: Reggie Dunbar
- Occupations: Publisher; talent manager; songwriter; record producer; machinist
- Spouse: Audree Neva Korthof (m. 1938; div. 1966)
- Children: Brian; Dennis; Carl
- Relatives: Mike Love (nephew); Stan Love (nephew); Carnie Wilson (granddaughter); Wendy Wilson (granddaughter); Kevin Love (grandnephew)
- Musical career
- Genres: Pop; easy listening
- Instruments: Piano; guitar
- Years active: 1952–1973
- Label: Capitol

Murry Gage Wilson (July 2, 1917 – June 4, 1973) was an American songwriter, talent manager, record producer, and music publisher, best known as the father of the Beach Boys' Brian, Dennis, and Carl Wilson. After the band's formation in 1961, Murry became their first manager, and in 1962, he founded their publishing company, Sea of Tunes, with Brian. Later in his life, Wilson was accused of physically and verbally abusing his children, charges which he denied.

Raised in Los Angeles, Wilson grew up in a hostile family environment due to his own father's violent nature. After his children were born, he founded a machining business, A.B.L.E. (Always Better Lasting Equipment) but maintained an active interest in music, which he passed along to his sons. Wilson authored or co-authored at least 50 compositions in his lifetime, albeit with little commercial success. His most popular songs were "Two-Step, Side-Step", recorded by Johnnie Lee Wills and Bonnie Lou in the 1950s, and "Break Away", released as a Beach Boys single in 1969. Wilson is also credited as producer for some of the band's early records, including the 1962 singles "409" and "Surfin' Safari".

The Beach Boys dismissed Wilson as their manager in early 1964 due to his overbearing and disruptive presence at the group's concerts and recording sessions. Following this, he produced the sound-alike group the Sunrays, and recorded an easy listening album, The Many Moods of Murry Wilson (1967). Wilson controlled the Beach Boys' publishing until 1969, when he sold Sea of Tunes to Irving Almo Music in exchange for $700,000 (equivalent to $6.15 million in 2025). In 1973, he died, aged 55, of a heart attack. His management of the group's publishing became the subject of numerous lawsuits decades later.

== Background ==
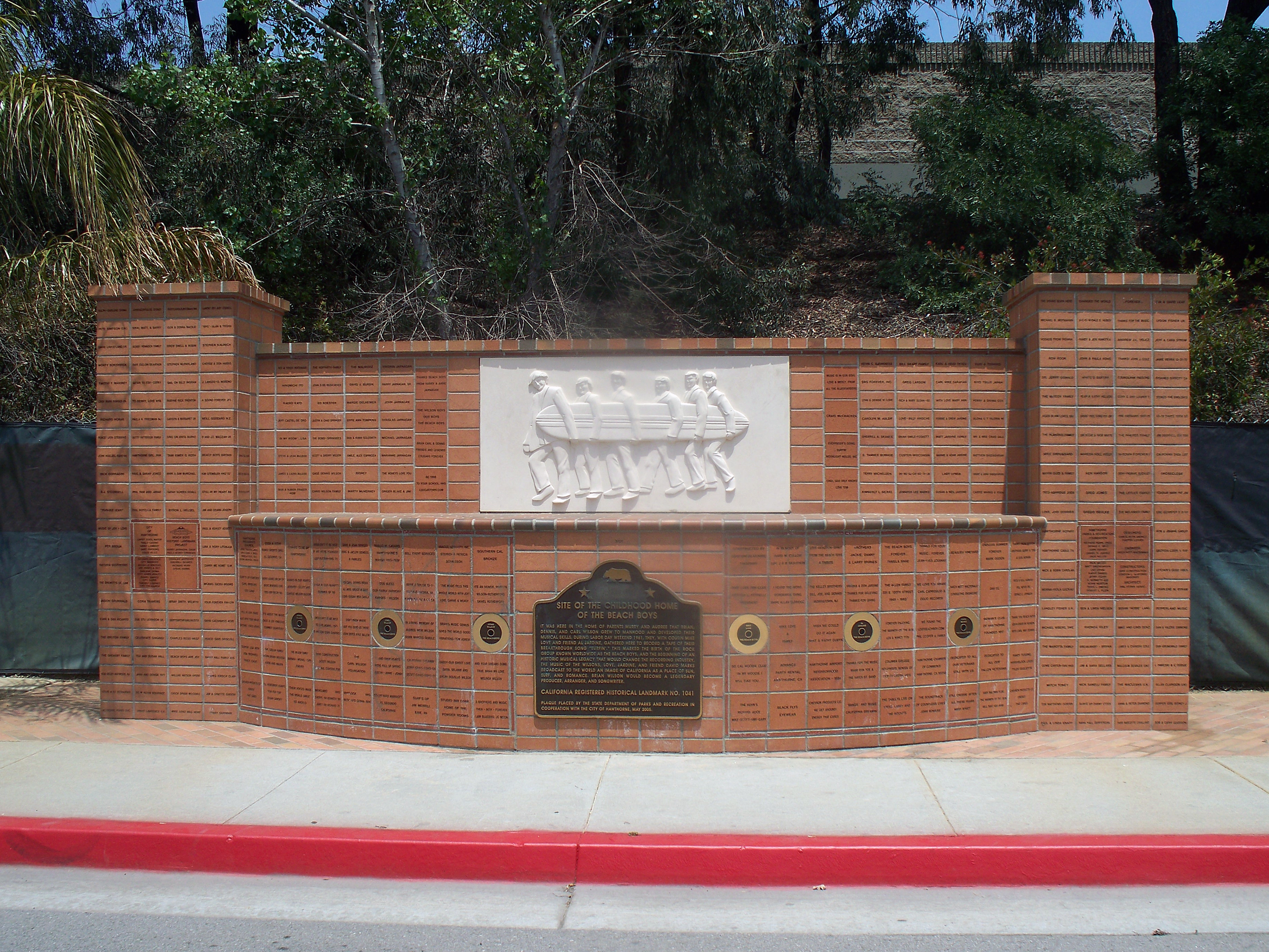
Historical landmark in Hawthorne, California, marking the site of the Wilson family home

Murry Gage Wilson was born on July 2, 1917, in Hutchinson, Kansas, as the third child and second son of Edith Sophia (née Sthole) and William Coral "Buddy" Wilson, a plumber. His father was of English, Irish, and Scottish descent, while his mother was of Swedish heritage. The middle name Gage was taken from the doctors who delivered him as a baby. One of Murry's eight siblings died in infancy. In 1921, the family moved west to Los Angeles, and were initially so impoverished that they camped for two months in a tent on the beach when they arrived. In 1929, the family settled at a home on 605 West 99th Street near Inglewood, and one year later, rented a nearby farmhouse at 9722 South Figueroa.

Buddy, who struggled with alcoholism, was often physically and verbally abusive to his family. In one incident, after Buddy's glasses were broken by Murry's younger brother Charlie, Buddy beat the boy so savagely that the rest of the family temporarily forced him out of the home. According to biographer Peter Ames Carlin, Murry increasingly "found himself thrust into the role of his mother's protector, raising his own fists against the father he loved but who seemed unable to love him or anyone else in the family."

Murry was interested in music from a young age and aspired to be a pop songwriter since he was a teenager. Of his musicianship, Carlin states that Murry was self-taught on guitar and received piano lessons from his sister, but biographer Timothy White writes that Murry could not play an instrument. In 1931, Wilson enrolled at Washington High School. There, he met Audree Neva Korthof, who, in addition to playing piano, sang at school functions and community events with her classmates. They graduated in June 1935 and were married on March 26, 1938.

Following graduation, Murry worked as a clerk at Southern California Gas Company, until the birth of their first child, Brian, in 1942. After Brian's birth Murry took a job as a junior administrator at the Los Angeles Goodyear Tire & Rubber factory, located at 6701 South Central Avenue, where he lost his left eye in an industrial accident. Wilson reflected, "When I was twenty-five I thought the world owed me a living. When I lost my eye, I tried harder, drove harder, and did the work of two men and got more raises." He had two more children with Audree, Dennis (born 1944) and Carl (born 1946). After Dennis's birth, the family purchased a two-bedroom house at West 119th Street in Hawthorne, California.

After his injury, Wilson returned to Goodyear, but soon left the factory for a job at Garrett AiResearch, where he worked from 1945 to 1950. He then did a four-year stint at Admiral Machinery Company, a heavy machinery leasing business, where he was employed by his younger brother Douglas. In March 1955, Murry obtained a loan of $20,000 (equivalent to $240,000 in 2025) to finance the start of his own machining business, A.B.L.E. Machinery Company (Always Better Lasting Equipment).

== Treatment of his children ==
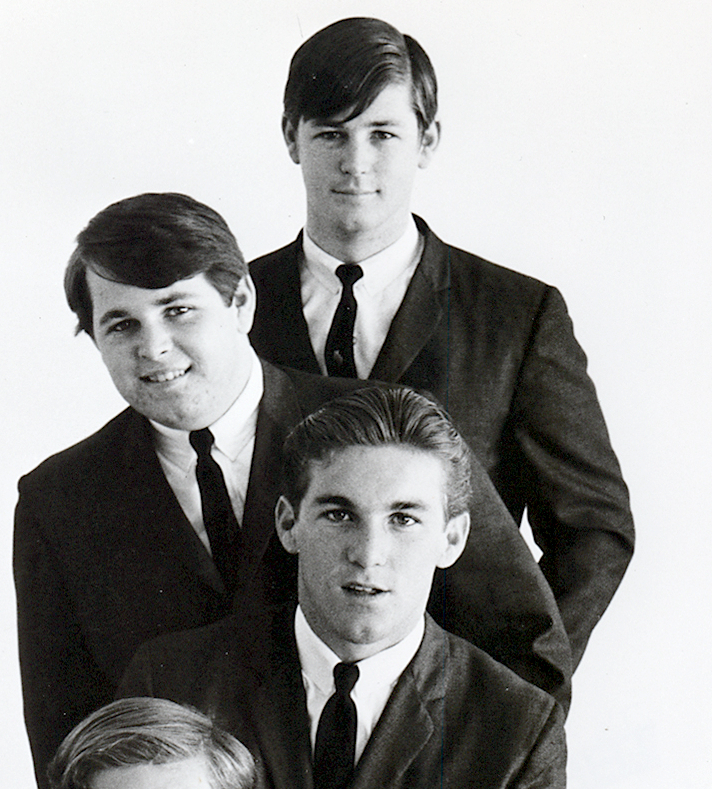
Wilson's sons Brian, Carl and Dennis (1963)

Wilson maintained an active interest in music, which he passed along to his sons, encouraging them to learn to sing and play instruments. Murry reflected, "I've been writing songs for as long as I can remember. My family has always had a great appreciation for the value of music. Many an evening my wife and I used to gather our sons and sing around our organ. Those were pretty lean days for us. We couldn't afford to go to a show, so we entertained ourselves with music." According to White, Murry was often forceful in this field.

The degree to which Murry fleshed out his goals through his infant children was in fact peculiar. He tried to transform every quaint babble and snatch of gurgling from his baby boys into songs, pounding a Hammond piano beside Brian's playpen for hours and giving his son the kind of playful pep talks that betray, at best, a budding stage father: "That's my new song! Did you like it? Of course you did! You loved it! Now I'm gonna teach you the words! Someday you're going to sing your father's songs and make us both famous! Okay, here we go."

The Wilson brothers did not publicly discuss their problematic relationship with their father until they were adults. Many stories of physical and verbal abuse surfaced, including a supposed incident where Murry hit Brian in the head with a 2×4, resulting in 90% hearing loss in his right ear, and another occasion in which he "disciplined" Brian by forcing him to defecate on a plate. (Note: Another version of the latter incident holds that Brian had willingly defecated on his father's dinner plate as a prank. Many of the stories surfaced after Murry's death, and much had been sourced from Capitol A&R man Nick Venet in the early 1970s.) Murry denied such reports when approached by Rolling Stone in 1971. According to biographer David Leaf, Murry later "telephoned Brian and angrily demanded that he retract the stories. Reportedly, Brian laughingly told his dad, 'I'll tell you what. Let's tell them that I shit in your ear, and you hit me in the head with a plate."

Out of the three Wilson brothers, Dennis was the most likely to get spanked by their father. Audree recalled, "Dennis had it the hardest; he got some very hard spankings. [Murry] was tough; I used to think he was too tough." Dennis later described his father as "a tyrant ... I don't know kids who got it like we did." Carl declined to comment on the accusations against his father. Brian's 2016 memoir states, "Lots of things have been written about my dad and the way he treated me and my brothers. Lots of them are true. Some of them are dirty lies. But even the things that are true aren't always what they seem." Leaf wrote, "Some people loved Murry, others insist he was a 'sick man,' but few will deny that he physically and verbally abused his children. ... In private, many people confirm that the Wilson brothers had it very hard."

Although he was a strict parent, Murry frequently surprised his children with gifts, such as a BB gun and a go-kart for Dennis. For Dennis's tenth birthday, Murry hosted a children's party that converted the family home into a jungle gym for Dennis and his friends to play in. One of Dennis's classmates, Don Allen, remembered Murry as "being outgoing, friendly, jovial, enthusiastic, and quite in the spirit of being a ten-year-old boy." Wilson's nephew Mike Love said that his uncle often applied a "Vulcan nerve pinch" to boys in the neighborhood. "He never truly hurt anyone, but he inspired plenty of fear."

== Early songwriting career and the Beach Boys ==
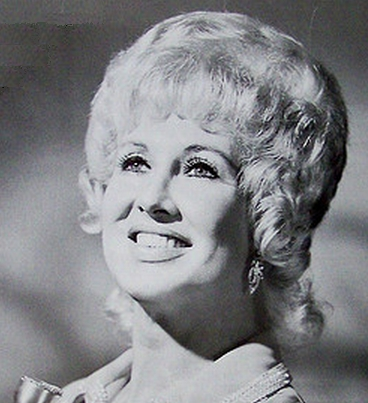
Bonnie Lou was among the acts that recorded Wilson's "Two Step, Side Step"

By 1950, Murry had written several songs. In 1952, he befriended songwriters Hite and Dorinda Morgan, a married couple who jointly operated Guild Music Company, their music publishing firm. Late in the year, Hite offered to publish two of Wilson's songs, the dance number "Two Step, Side Step" and the ballad "I'll Hide My Tears", and have them recorded with help from Hite's connections in the Los Angeles music industry. In exchange for signing with the Morgans, Murry received $50 as an advance on future royalties the songs may yield.

In early 1953, the couple arranged to have "Two Side, Side Step" recorded by Palace Records act the Bachelors. (Note: The Bachelors later recorded Wilson's "I'll Hide My Tears" (1953) and "Te-e-e-xas" (1955).) To promote the forthcoming record, member Jimmie Haskell arranged to have the song performed by the Lawrence Welk Orchestra on Welk's nationally broadcast On the Air from the Aragon radio show in May 1953. (Note: Welk never recorded the song, although Wilson printed sheet music that displayed a photo of Welk on the front cover with the caption "Featured by Lawrence Welk, Coral Recording Artist.") Also arranged by Hite, renditions of Wilson's "Painting with Teardrops (of Blue)" and "Two Step, Side Step" were recorded by country singer Johnny Hall and released as a single on the Recorded in Hollywood label. In 1954, "I'll Hide My Tears" was recorded by the Jets (a reconfiguration of the Hollywood Flames), and "Two Step, Side Step" was recorded by early rock 'n' roll singer Bonnie Lou. Billboard reviewed Lou's rendition as a "cute bouncy tune" that would likely become a popular jukebox pick.

After the Beach Boys' formation, Murry became the group's business manager, co-producer, and publisher in the early part of their career. Murry was a tough negotiator on the band's behalf, organizing a contract signing with Capitol Records. Around June 1962, Murry and Brian established the music publishing company Sea of Tunes to safeguard Brian's compositions. The Beach Boys' first few records credited Capitol A&R director Nick Venet as producer. After April 1963, Capitol allowed Brian to produce their records himself, following Murry's insistence. Murry also introduced Brian to Roger Christian, who became Brian's writing partner for the band's car songs.

== Dismissal as the Beach Boys' manager ==
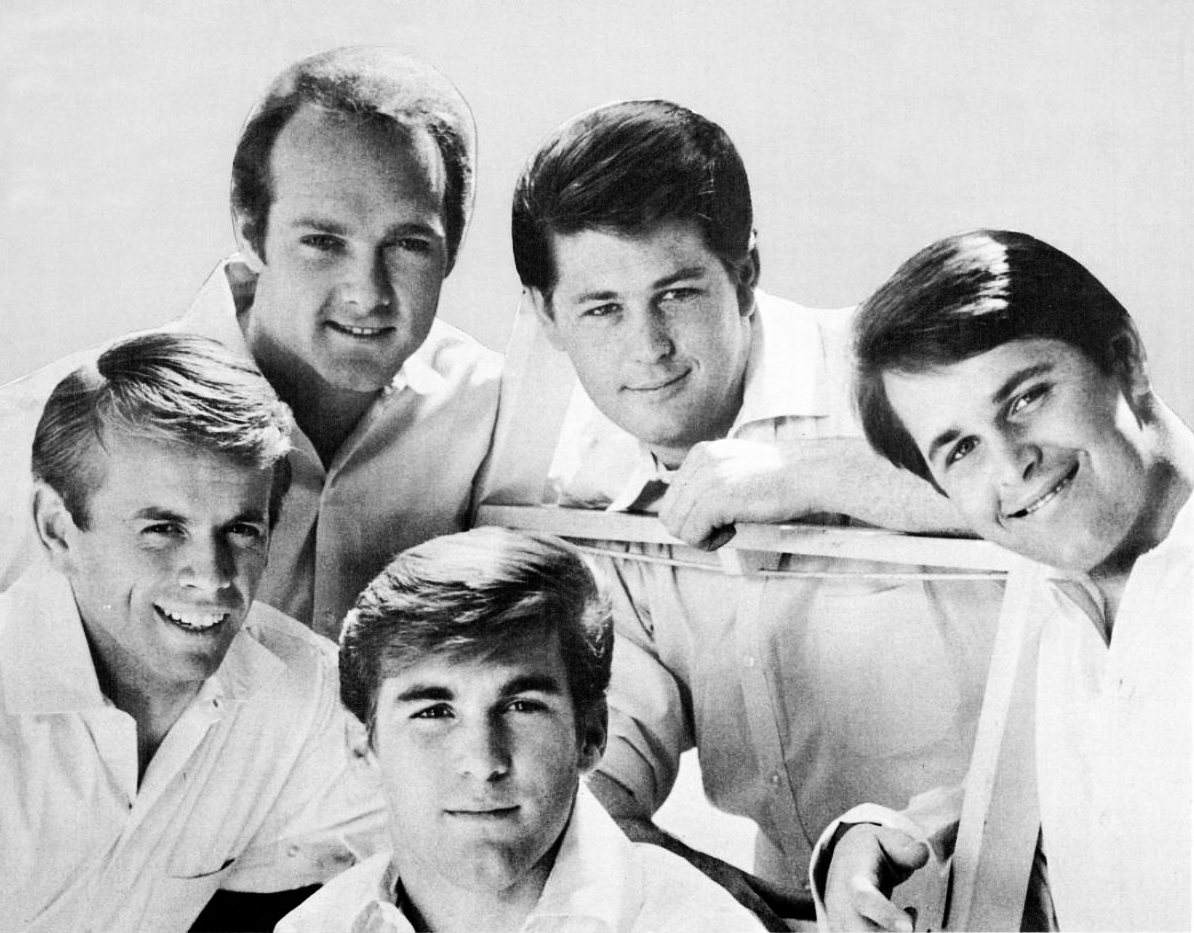
The Beach Boys, 1964

Murry accompanied the group on their first Australasian tour in January 1964, and requested that the band not fraternize with women, use profanity, or drink alcoholic beverages. During his early years, Wilson charged the group $100 for violating these requests, but for this tour, he increased the fine to $1,000, which he would subtract from the touring proceeds. At the time, Wilson's influence on the Beach Boys ignited tensions within the group.

Upon the tour's completion, the band members held a vote in which they unanimously agreed to relieve Murry from his managerial duties. According to Love, "Brian and I drove to his parents' house, and Brian told him straight out: 'Look, we can't deal with you anymore. We've got to get a new manager.'" In Carl's recollection, "I remember having a conversation with my dad in his bedroom at home. I said, 'They really don't want you to manage the group anymore.' When I think about it, that must have really crushed him. After all, he gave up his home and business for us. He was kind of crackers over us." Audree said that the dismissal "destroyed" her husband and that he refused to leave his bed for weeks.

Another report suggests that Wilson was fired in early April 1964, following incidents involving the recording sessions of the singles "Fun, Fun, Fun" and "I Get Around". According to Mike Love, by then, Murry had already stopped managing the band for a "couple months", although he did disrupt a studio session in April. "Brian had a hard time standing up to his father, but this time he did. ... Then he shoved his dad, who went sprawling backward. That was the only time I ever saw Brian defy him physically, and Murry, defeated, left the studio." In 1966, Brian reflected, "We love the family thing – y'know: three brothers, a cousin and a friend is a really beautiful way to have a group – but the extra generation can become a hang-up."

== Aftermath and the Sunrays ==
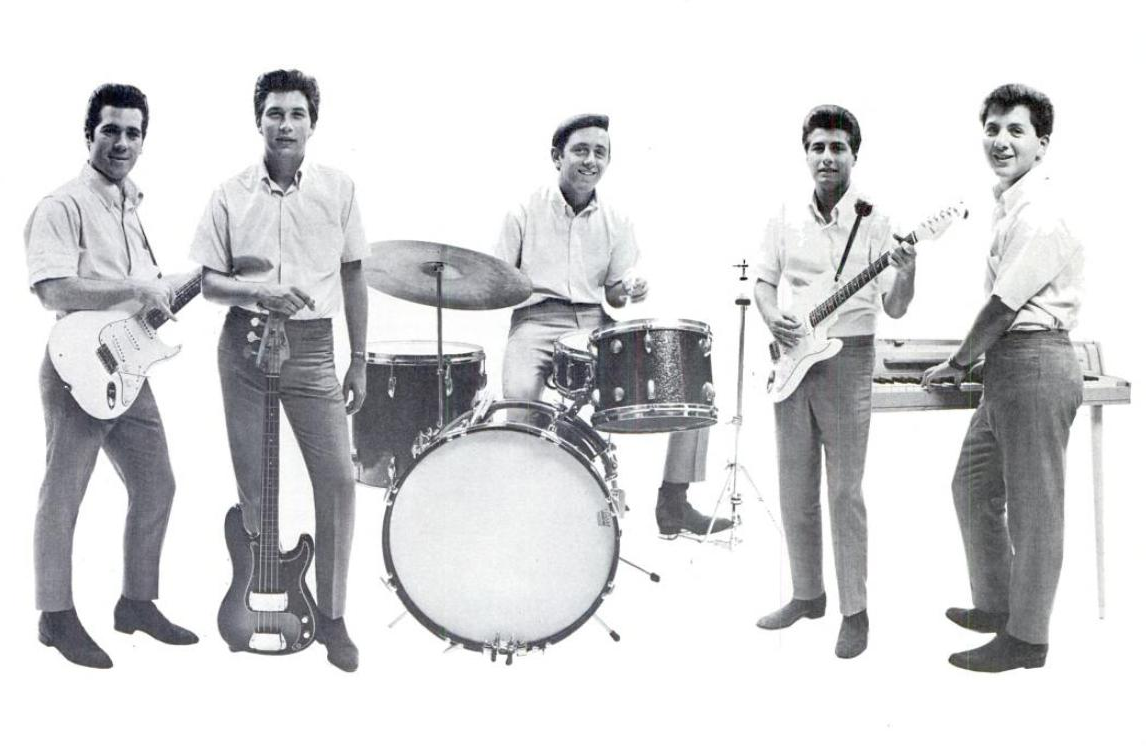
After he was relieved as the Beach Boys' manager, Wilson produced and managed the Sunrays

Even after Murry's formal business relationship with the Beach Boys ended, he remained in close contact with the group, letting Brian know his thoughts about the band's decisions. Brian also periodically sought advice from his father. In 1964, Murry sold off his machinery business and separated from Audree. (Note: On August 7, 1964, Wilson wrote a last will and testament that stated, in part, "[Audree] told me on this date ... that she did not enjoy intercourse with me anymore ... I am a very unhappy and broken-heated [sic] man about my family.") According to music historian Mark Dillon, it has been alleged that Wilson had one or more extramarital affairs, "but whether this was in the aftermath of his separation from Audree or was ultimately the cause is not known." Biographer Peter Ames Carlin suggested that Brian's song "Let Him Run Wild" (1965) was inspired by Murry's affairs.

In June 1964, Murry produced three tracks for David Marks' group the Marksmen: "Car Party", "Casanova", and "Leaves". During the mid-1960s, Murry produced and managed the Sunrays, a group comprising five students who attended Hollywood Professional High School led by Rick Henn, a friend of Carl Wilson. The Sunrays earned some media attention and a bit of airplay for their initial singles, but never broke into the national Top 40. Their two best-known singles, "I Live for the Sun" and "Andrea", were regional hits in California. Session drummer Hal Blaine remembered of the Sunrays sessions, "You could smell the liquor something terrible when he [Wilson] came near you. Everybody got a two-dollar bill as a tip before we started, and then he'd get down on one knee and say a prayer. It was very weird."

In February 1965, Wilson visited a Beach Boys recording session for "Help Me, Rhonda" and, to the group's annoyance, attempted to resume his role as the band's producer. A tape of the session later circulated widely among bootleggers. On May 8, Murry drafted an eight-page letter to Brian in which he correlated the Beach Boys' rise to fame with the disintegration of his family. He wrote that he felt he was "almost [in] a living hell" and "wanted to give up completely on two separate occasions." Dillon wrote that the letter "provides a wealth of insight into his conflicted personality, and it made headlines in 2009 after being posted online."

For their next album, Summer Days (And Summer Nights!!) (released July 1965), Brian wrote a novelty song inspired by his father: "I'm Bugged at My Ol' Man". Murry later commented on the song, "He meant it as a put-on, but he meant it." In July, he sent a letter to Brian requesting that he be officially granted sole ownership of Sea of Tunes, per a verbal agreement they had reached in 1962. According to historian Keith Badman, "Brian allowed Murry to take total control to stop his father's continual hassling on the matter."

In 1966, the Beach Boys released the album Pet Sounds. On the advice of his father, Brian sped up the track "Caroline, No" to make the vocal sound younger. Murry later told Rolling Stone that he enjoyed the album and praised it as a "masterpiece of accomplishment for Brian", noting that it had become a ubiquitous influence on the music heard in product commercials. Dennis echoed that his father "used to go to pieces when he heard stuff like 'Caroline, No.'" Venet, who was not as enthusiastic with the album, told biographer Steven Gaines that he believed the record was Brian's attempt to "torment his father with songs his father couldn't relate to, and melody structures his father couldn't understand." Tony Asher, the album's lyricist, remembered negotiating his cut of the royalties with Murry, describing his 25% share as "a screw".

Although their marriage ended in divorce in 1966, Murry and Audree remained closely involved with each other until his death. However, Audree lived in a separate home that was purchased for her by Murry. After Carl and Brian revealed that they were marijuana smokers to their parents, Murry forbade Audree from allowing her sons to visit her home until Christmas 1967.

== The Many Moods of Murry Wilson and Sea of Tunes sale ==
In October 1967, Capitol released Murry's The Many Moods of Murry Wilson, an easy listening LP that included a rendition of "The Warmth of the Sun". While promoting the album in Britain, he told Disc & Music Echo that "after 'Good Vibrations' Brian lost a lot of confidence. He didn't think he could ever write anything as good as that again ... With [my] LP I'm going to nudge my boys' competitive spirit." "Leaves" was released in the United States as the album's (and Wilson's) only single in December 1967 with British demonstration records of "The Plumber's Tune" being produced by EMI for Capitol at the same time.

In 1968, Wilson appeared on the Beach Boys' Friends album, singing the brief bass vocal harmony in the chorus of "Be Here in the Mornin'". In early 1969, he co-wrote the Beach Boys' song "Break Away" with Brian, and was credited under the pseudonym "Reggie Dunbar" on the record, which was released without much commercial success. In October, he returned to the studio to work on various productions, including a song titled "Gonna Be Alright".

In late 1969, Wilson sold Sea of Tunes, over the band's objections, for the undervalued amount of $700,000 (equivalent to $6.15 million in 2025). Brian later suggested that his signature was forged by his father on several related business documents, making the sale illegal.

== Illness and death ==
In April 1970, Wilson assembled a tape comprising songs that he had recorded at Sunset Sound Recorders called "So Much in Love" and "Love to Be Your Lover". The tape begins with a spoken interlude in which Wilson suggests the Beach Boys should record these songs, as he "doesn't have long to live". In August 1971, Wilson cut a song he wrote with Brian called "Won't You Tell Me". The Sunrays released their version of the song on the 1996 compilation For Collectors Only: Vintage Rays. Other versions of the song – one an organ demo by Brian, and another featuring Brian and Carl on lead vocals – remained unreleased until the 2021 box set Feel Flows. On September 11, Disc & Music Echo reported that when Dennis had permanently left the Beach Boys, he was in the process of "setting up a production and publication company with his father".

In 1972, Murry became ill with diverticulitis that contributed to his worsening heart disease. Also that year, he worked on various songs, including one called "Take Back the Time". In October, he recorded a commercial jingle that he intended to offer to the Kentucky Fried Chicken restaurant chain. In the spring of 1973, he had a heart attack and was hospitalized for one or two weeks. During his final years, Murry had regularly socialized with Dennis. Audree recalled, "They were buddies. It's the most amazing thing ... Dennis called his father on Mother's Day and Murry told him, 'I'm just going to live about a month.' Dennis didn't tell me this, thank God! I didn't need to know that, but he could tell Dennis that."

On June 4, 1973, Murry died at his home in Whittier, California, after having a heart attack at the age of 55. His official cause of death was attributed to "acute myocardial infarcation" as a result of "coronary atherosclerosis". Brian and Dennis did not attend the funeral, but Dennis visited Murry's body in the morgue. Brian later said, "I didn’t go to his funeral. I went to New York with Diane, my sister-in-law. I wasn’t staying away out of anger or anything. It was just too many things all at once, and I was not in the mood to go to my dad’s funeral." Carl said, "I really loved my dad a lot. It just about killed Brian when our dad died."

Murry was buried in Inglewood Park Cemetery in Inglewood, California, in an unmarked grave. Shortly after Murry's death, Brian told an interviewer that he was planning to record Murry's song "Lazaloo". (Note: Brian described the song as "five and a half minutes long. It was about an exotic love affair in Turkey. Dad was a little ballsy.") It was also reported that Brian wrote a song, "Just an Imitation", as a tribute to his father. As of 2014, a tape of the song had yet to surface. Wilson later described it as "a beautiful ballad and kind of a tribute to my dad." On December 1, 1997, Audree died of kidney failure and cardiovascular issues at the age of 80.

== Legacy ==
=== Recognition ===
In a 2004 interview, Brian recalled of his father, "He was the one who got us going. He didn't make us better artists or musicians, but he gave us ambition. I'm pleased he pushed us, because it was such a relief to know there was someone as strong as my dad to keep things going. He used to spank us, and it hurt too, but I loved him because he was a great musician." Furthermore, in 2005, he said that although people often mislabel Murry as an untalented songwriter, "[he] had talent, he sure did. He was a talented man. He had some music in him ... My favorite song of his was one called 'His Little Darling and You'. It was a ballad." In 2008, Brian included his own reworked version of the song, retitled "Just Like Me And You", as a bonus track on his album That Lucky Old Sun.

Engineer Chuck Britz, studio owner Stan Ross, record executive Russ Regan, and band promoter Fred Vail all spoke positively of Murry and credited him with much of the band's initial success. Members of the Sunrays described Murry as "the [nicest] man ever" and denied seeing any abuse from him toward the Beach Boys. Britz said: "I was one of the few people who liked Murry. I always did. I admired him for the way he got the kids mad at him; that made them also conscious of what they were trying to achieve. I realize that maybe he did it the wrong way, but at the same time, he did make them work as a team which was the way it should be." Vail likened their father to "an Army drill sergeant" and said that he was "key" to the band's success, before adding,

Murry wasn't in it for the money. Murry was in it to help his sons, to help make his sons a hit band. He wasn't greedy like a lot of other managers. With Murry, it was love, it was family. ... I never saw him attack the boys physically. I saw him fine the boys for cussing or for doing some childish pranks. But his important role in the boys' career was overlooked.

James Murphy, author of Becoming the Beach Boys, commented that "material possessions do not make a childhood happy, but Murry did his best [on a modest salary] to provide his boys with things they enjoyed. And no one fought harder for the fledgling Beach Boys than Murry." Conversely, in his 2016 memoir, Mike Love wrote that Murry was "a driving force in the Beach Boys’ early success, but his greed and vindictiveness deny him any tribute. The most forgiving thing I can say about him is that he was simply an inheritor of his own father’s cruelty." He added, "what is often missed in the Wilson family history is that my aunt Audree was the true musical talent in that marriage." Brian stated in a 2005 interview that Murry "was a bad musician. I learned nothing from him."

=== Posthumous releases and tributes ===
The Sunrays' 1996 retrospective compilation album For Collectors Only marked the first time Wilson's music had been officially released since his death over 20 years earlier, including a 1972 demo of "The Colonel's Song", which was envisioned as a commercial jingle for Kentucky Fried Chicken. In 2019, an extended play of songs recorded by Wilson and unknown Midwestern vocal group Snow (supposedly introduced to Wilson by Rick Henn) in 1969 including "Break Away" was released via download by Omnivore Recordings. In 2020, musician George Faulkner released a tribute album, George Faulkner Sings Murry Wilson, containing 11 Wilson songs. It was the first vinyl LP collection of vocal songs composed by Wilson ever released. This included "For You and Me", a 1953 composition that was discovered in demo form on a set of acetate discs found at a Los Angeles-area thrift store. David Marks contributed liner notes to the album. The LP was followed in 2022 by a 5-song CD E.P. called George Faulkner Sings More Murry Wilson featuring additional new renditions of rare Murry Wilson compositions.

=== Fictional portrayals ===
Wilson was portrayed in two television movies: in 1990's Summer Dreams: The Story of the Beach Boys, by Arlen Dean Snyder, and in 2000's The Beach Boys: An American Family, by Kevin Dunn. The latter program inspired illustrator Peter Bagge and comedian Dana Gould to create a 2000 web cartoon based on Wilson, titled Rock and Roll Dad, with Wilson voiced by Paul F. Tompkins. In the 2014 biopic Love & Mercy, Wilson is portrayed by Bill Camp.

== Works ==
Solo releases

- The Many Moods of Murry Wilson (1967)
- "Leaves" / "The Plumber's Tune" (single from Many Moods, 1967)
- The Break Away EP (with Snow, posthumous release, 2019)

Compositions

Wilson wrote at least 50 compositions in his lifetime, with over 25 recorded by other artists. Listed below are released compositions, authored or co-authored by Wilson, that were recorded by himself or other artists.

- "Two-Step, Side-Step"
- "For You and Me"
- "Tabor-Inn" / "Tabarin"
- "Break Away" (with Brian Wilson)
- "I'll Hide My Tears"
- "Heartbreak Lane" (with Brian Wilson)
- "Painting with Teardrops of Blue" / "Painting with Teardrops"
- "Young Love Is Everywhere" / "Leaves"
- "Come to Me"
- "Happy, Happy Holiday"
- "Te-e-e-e-exas"
- "Love Won't Wait"
- "Betty's Waltz" (with Audree Wilson)
- "Won't You Tell Me"
- "Outta Gas"
- "Car Party"
- "Bye Baby Bye" (with Brian Wilson and Audree Wilson)
- "The Colonel's Song"

== Bibliography ==
- Badman, Keith (2004). The Beach Boys: The Definitive Diary of America's Greatest Band, on Stage and in the Studio. Backbeat Books. ISBN 978-0-87930-818-6.
- Carlin, Peter Ames (2006). Catch a Wave: The Rise, Fall, and Redemption of the Beach Boys' Brian Wilson. Rodale. ISBN 978-1-59486-320-2.
- Dillon, Mark (2012). Fifty Sides of the Beach Boys: The Songs That Tell Their Story. ECW Press. ISBN 978-1-77090-198-8.
- Gaines, Steven (1986). Heroes and Villains: The True Story of The Beach Boys. New York: Da Capo Press. ISBN 0306806479.
- Leaf, David (1978). The Beach Boys and the California Myth. Grosset & Dunlap. ISBN 978-0-448-14626-3.
- Love, Mike (2016). Good Vibrations: My Life as a Beach Boy. Penguin Publishing Group. ISBN 978-0-399-17641-8.
- Murphy, James B. (2015). Becoming the Beach Boys, 1961-1963. McFarland. ISBN 978-1-4766-1853-1.
- White, Timothy (1996). The Nearest Faraway Place: Brian Wilson, the Beach Boys, and the Southern Californian Experience. Macmillan. ISBN 0333649370.
- Wilson, Brian; Greenman, Ben (2016). I Am Brian Wilson: A Memoir. Da Capo Press. ISBN 978-0-306-82307-7.
