= The Sunrays =

American band from Pacific Palisades, California

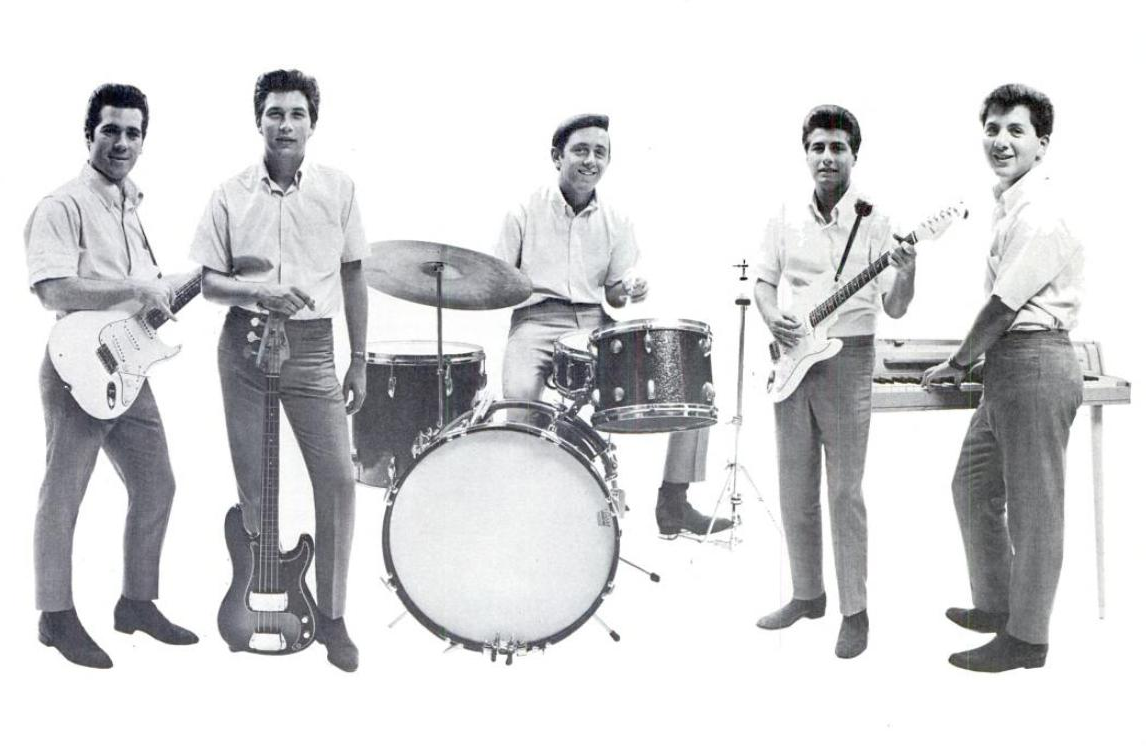
- The Sunrays in 1965

Background information
- Also known as: The Renegades, The Renegade 5, Larry Tremaine & The Renegades, The Rangers, The Dirt Riders
- Origin: Pacific Palisades, California
- Past members: Rick Henn; Eddy Medora; Byron Case; Marty DiGiovanni; Vince Hozier; Steve O'Riley

The Sunrays (previously known as the Renegades, the Renegade 5, Larry Tremaine & the Renegades, the Rangers and the Dirt Riders) were an American band from Pacific Palisades, California. The group was led by singer/songwriter/drummer Rick Henn, who was a friend of the Beach Boys member Carl Wilson. Other members of the band were guitarists Eddy Medora and Byron Case, keyboard player Marty DiGiovanni, and bassist Vince Hozier.

== Career ==
Their first job as the Renegades (in the late 1950s) was at the Seaside Session at Palisades Park in Pacific Palisades. In 1961 they teamed up with Larry Tremaine, and became Larry Tremaine and the Renegades, a rock and roll cover band, consisting of: Larry Tremaine, Steve O'Riley (now deceased), Marty DiGiovanni, Rick Henn, Eddy Medora (November 28, 1945 – October 27, 2006), and Vince Hozier (February 26, 1946 – March 18, 2007). Tremaine booked them every week at radio dances, UCLA, clubs, celebrity parties, and corporate events.

They appeared at Crescendo Interlude on the Sunset Strip with Joey Dee and the Starliters, the Teen Age Fair at Pacific Ocean Park, the after party for the 1963 Academy Awards, The Bob Eubanks TV Dance Party, and every Friday night as the house dance party band at the San Bernardino, California Civic Auditorium.

In 1963, Tremaine went into the radio stations KBLA and KRLA, and later television, and became the host of the syndicated nationwide Casino Royale Dance Party.

In 1964, Murry Wilson, the father of Brian, Carl, and Dennis Wilson of the Beach Boys, started managing them and changed their name to The Sunrays. Eddy Medora switched from the saxophone to rhythm guitar. Steve O'Riley, who played lead guitar and sang, left the band when "I Live for the Sun" began to break, saying "I don't wanna be in the group anymore, I think I can make it on my own." O'Riley was replaced by Byron Case.

Their hits included "I Live for the Sun" (1965) (No. 51 US, No. 20 Australia), "Andrea" (1966) (No. 41 US), and "Still" (1966) (No. 93 US).

They toured the United States and opened for the Beach Boys in the U.S. and Canada.

== Members ==
Partial credits.

- Larry Tremaine (1961—19??)
- Steve O'Riley – vocals, lead guitar (1961–1965; deceased)
- Marty DiGiovanni – keyboards
- Rick Henn – vocals, drums
- Eddy Medora (November 28, 1945 – October 27, 2006) – saxophone, lead guitar
- Vince Hozier (February 26, 1946 – March 18, 2007) – bass
- Byron Case – rhythm guitar (1965—19??)

== Discography ==
=== Singles ===
- "Car Party" / "Outta Gas" — Tower 101—September 1964
- "I Live For The Sun" (Billboard No. 51, RPM No. 3) / "Bye Baby Bye" — Tower 148—August 1965
- "Andrea" (Billboard No. 41, RPM No. 2)) / "You Don't Phase Me" — Tower 191—December 1965
- "Still" (Billboard No. 93, RPM No. 72)) / "When You're Not Here" — Tower 224—March 1966
- "Don't Take Yourself Too Seriously" / "I Look Baby, I Can't See" — Tower 256—July 1966
- "Hi, How Are You" / "Just 'Round The River Bend" — Tower 290—November 1966
- "Loaded With Love" / "Time (A Special Thing)" — Tower 340—May 1967

=== Albums ===
- Andrea — Tower T-5017 (Mono)/ST-5017 (Stereo)—1966

=== Compilation albums ===
- Vintage Rays — Collectable Records—1996
