= 20th Satellite Awards =

Awards ceremony for film and television

- Date: February 21, 2016

Highlights
- Best film: Spotlight
- Best television drama: Better Call Saul
- Best television musical/comedy: Silicon Valley
- Best director: Tom McCarthy for Spotlight

The 20th Satellite Awards is an award ceremony honoring the year's outstanding performers, films, television shows, home videos and interactive media, presented by the International Press Academy.

The nominations were announced on December 1, 2015. The winners were announced on February 21, 2016.

The film The Martian led all nominees with nine, including Best Film and Best Director (Ridley Scott).

== Special achievement awards ==
- Auteur Award (for singular vision and unique artistic control over the elements of production) – Robert M. Young
- Humanitarian Award (for making a difference in the lives of those in the artistic community and beyond) – Spike Lee
- Mary Pickford Award (for outstanding contribution to the entertainment industry) – Louise Fletcher
- Nikola Tesla Award (for visionary achievement in filmmaking technology) – HIVE Lighting Plasma Wizards
- Breakthrough Performance Award – Jacob Tremblay (Room)
- Special Award for Breakthrough Comedian – Amy Schumer

== Motion picture winners and nominees ==
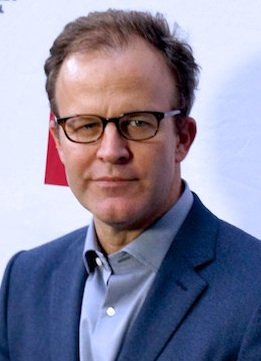
Tom McCarthy, Best Director winner & Best Original Screenplay co-winner

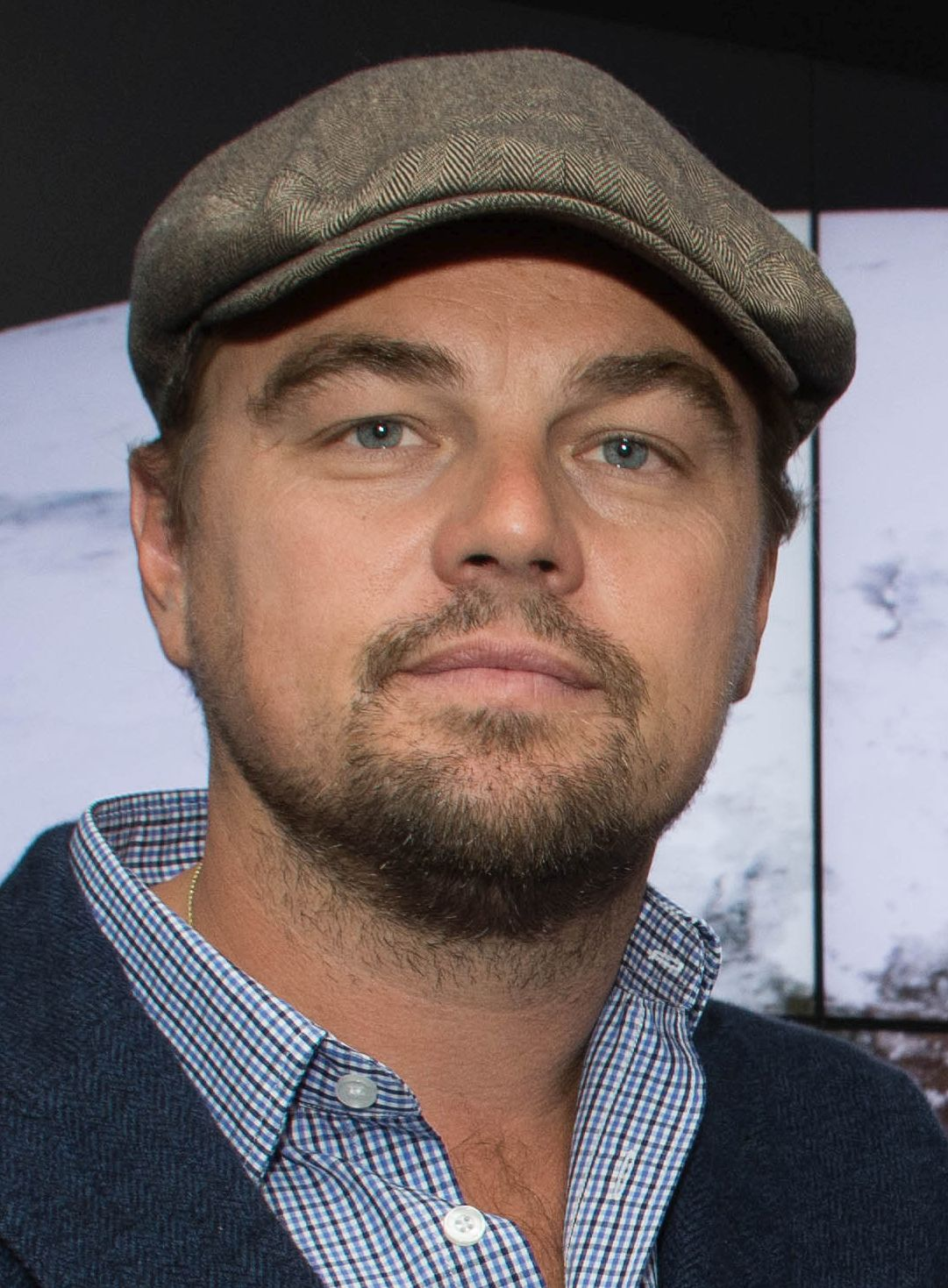
Leonardo DiCaprio, Best Actor in a Motion Picture winner

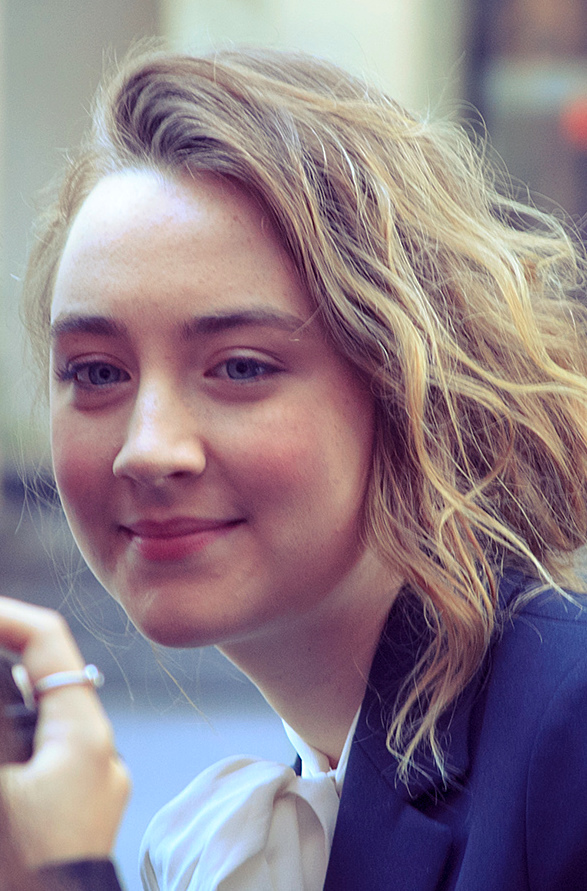
Saoirse Ronan, Best Actress in a Motion Picture winner

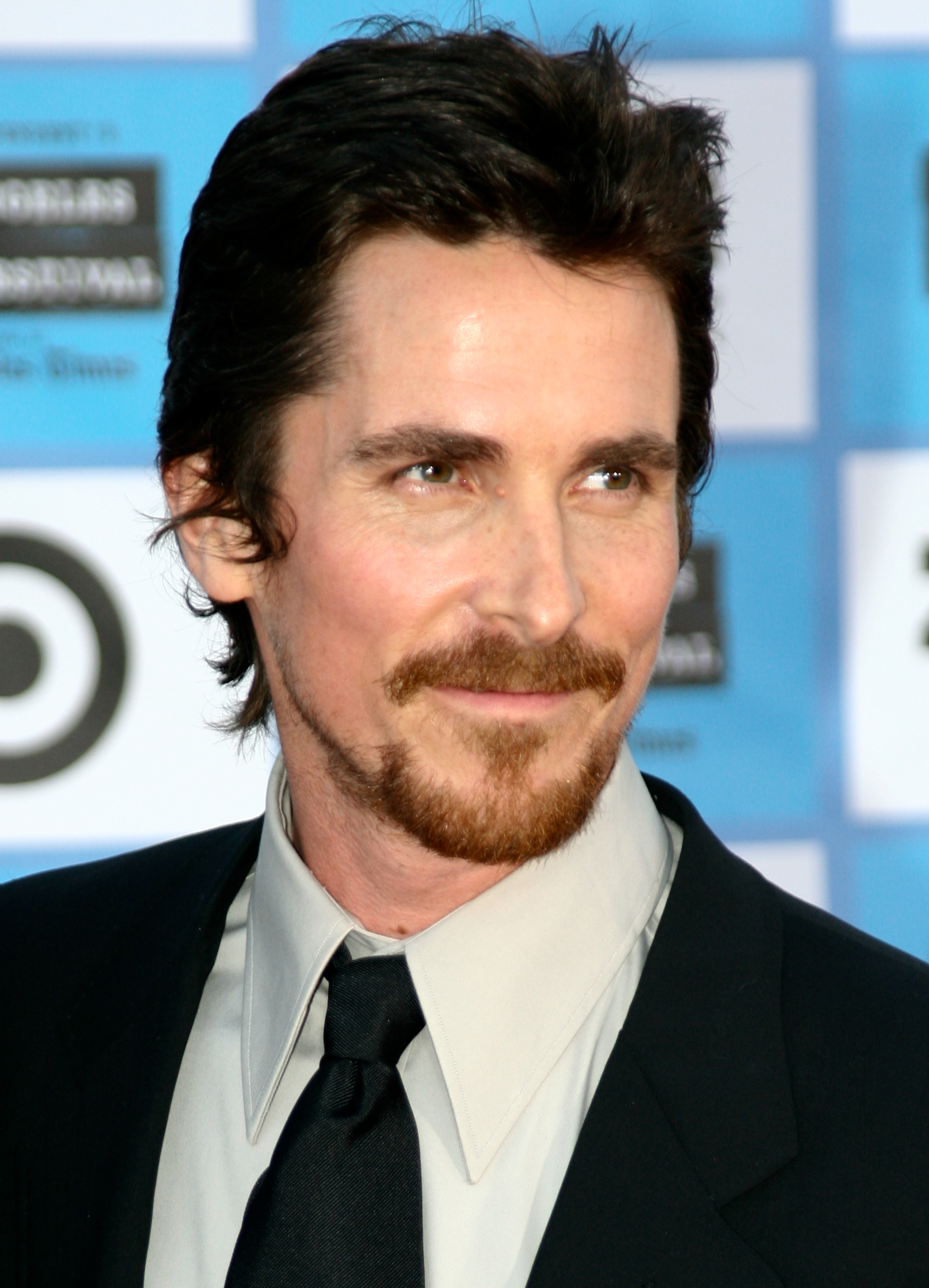
Christian Bale, Best Supporting Actor in a Motion Picture winner

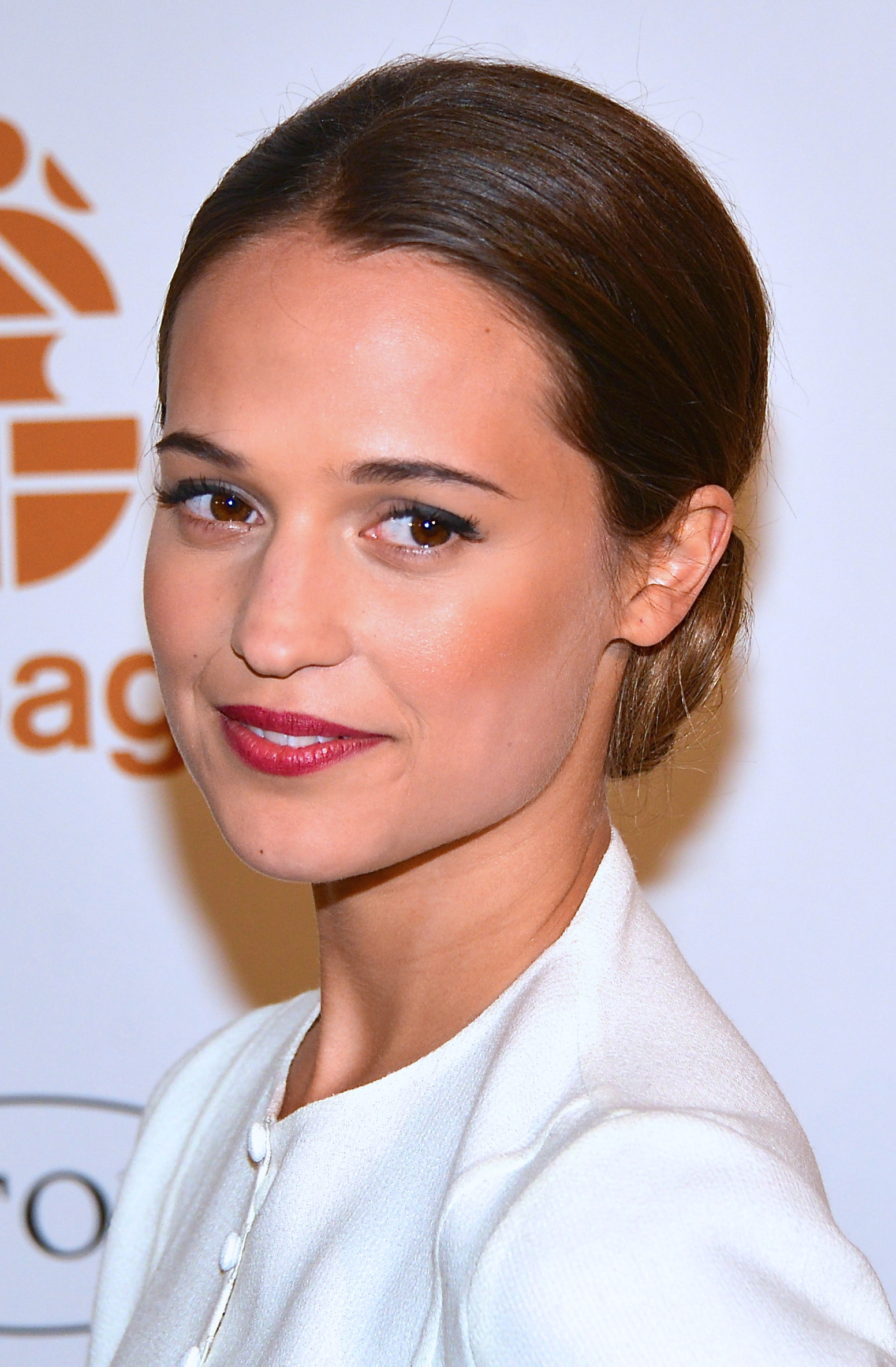
Alicia Vikander, Best Supporting Actress in a Motion Picture winner

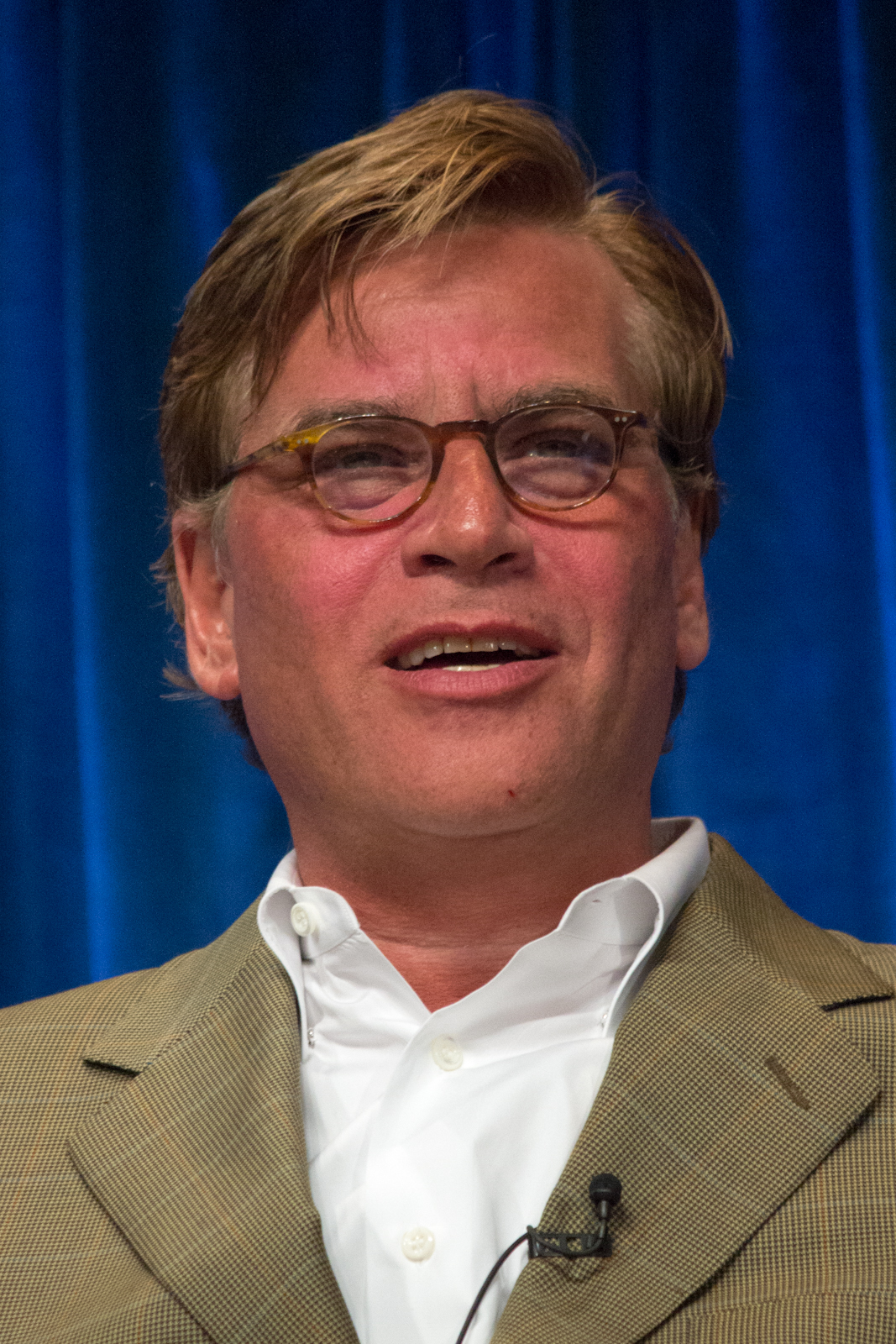
Aaron Sorkin, Best Adapted Screenplay winner

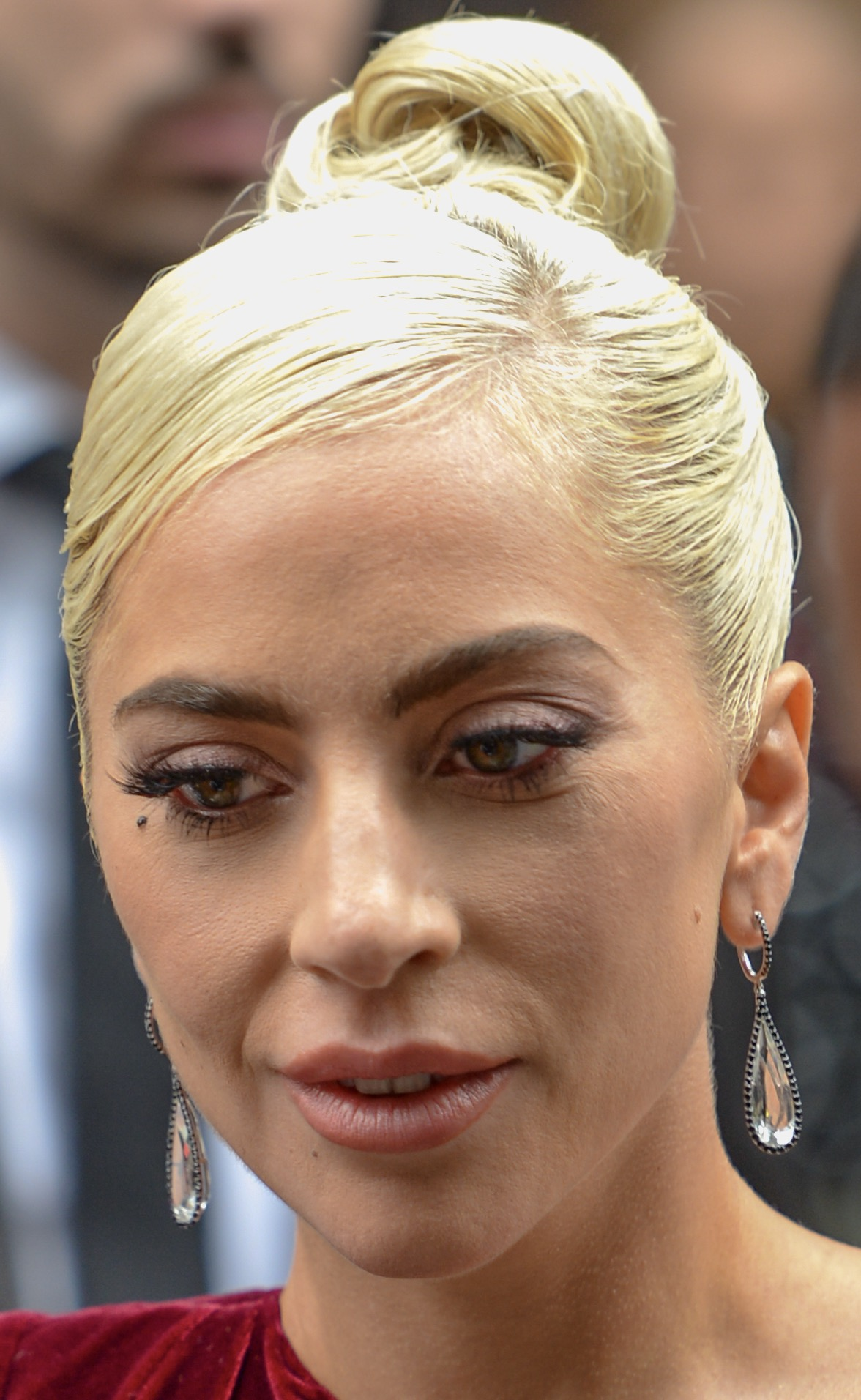
Lady Gaga, Best Original Song co-winner

Winners are listed first and highlighted in bold.

Best Film	Best Director
**Spotlight**; The Big Short; Black Mass; Bridge of Spies; Brooklyn; Carol; The Martian; The Revenant; Room; Sicario	**Tom McCarthy – Spotlight**; Lenny Abrahamson – Room; Tom Hooper – The Danish Girl; Alejandro G. Iñárritu – The Revenant; Ridley Scott – The Martian; Steven Spielberg – Bridge of Spies
Best Actor	Best Actress
**Leonardo DiCaprio – The Revenant as Hugh Glass**; Matt Damon – The Martian as Mark Watney; Johnny Depp – Black Mass as James "Whitey" Bulger; Michael Fassbender – Steve Jobs as Steve Jobs; Tom Hardy – Legend as Ronald "Ronnie" Kray and Reginald "Reggie" Kray; Eddie Redmayne – The Danish Girl as Lili Elbe; Will Smith – Concussion as Bennet Omalu	**Saoirse Ronan – Brooklyn as Ellis Lacey**; Cate Blanchett – Carol as Carol Aird; Blythe Danner – I'll See You in My Dreams as Carol Petersen; Brie Larson – Room as Joy "Ma" Newsome; Carey Mulligan – Suffragette as Maud Watts; Charlotte Rampling – 45 Years as Kate Mercer
Best Supporting Actor	Best Supporting Actress
**Christian Bale – The Big Short as Michael Burry**; Paul Dano – Love & Mercy as young Brian Wilson; Benicio del Toro – Sicario as Alejandro Gillick; Michael Keaton – Spotlight as Walter "Robby" Robinson; Mark Ruffalo – Spotlight as Michael Rezendes; Sylvester Stallone – Creed as Rocky Balboa	**Alicia Vikander – The Danish Girl as Gerda Wegener**; Elizabeth Banks – Love & Mercy as Melinda Ledbetter; Jane Fonda – Youth as Brenda Morel; Rooney Mara – Carol as Therese Belivard; Rachel McAdams – Spotlight as Sacha Pfeiffer; Kate Winslet – Steve Jobs as Joanna Hoffman
Best Original Screenplay	Best Adapted Screenplay
**Spotlight – Tom McCarthy and Josh Singer**; Bridge of Spies – Matt Charman, Joel Coen, and Ethan Coen; Inside Out – Pete Docter, Josh Cooley, and Meg LeFauve; Love & Mercy – Michael Alan Lerner and Oren Moverman; Straight Outta Compton – Jonathan Herman and Andrea Berloff; Suffragette – Abi Morgan	**Steve Jobs – Aaron Sorkin**; Black Mass – Jez Butterworth and Mark Mallouk; The Danish Girl – Lucinda Coxon; The Martian – Drew Goddard; The Revenant – Alejandro G. Iñárritu and Mark L. Smith; Room – Emma Donoghue
Best Animated or Mixed Media Film	Best Foreign Language Film
**Inside Out**; Anomalisa; The Good Dinosaur; The Peanuts Movie; The Prophet; Shaun the Sheep Movie	**Son of Saul (Hungary)**; The Assassin (Taiwan); The Brand New Testament (Belgium); Goodnight Mommy (Austria); The High Sun (Croatia); Labyrinth of Lies (Germany); Mustang (France); A Pigeon Sat on a Branch Reflecting on Existence (Sweden); The Second Mother (Brazil); The Throne (South Korea)
Best Documentary Film	Best Cinematography
**Amy (TIE)**; **The Look of Silence (TIE)**; Becoming Bulletproof; Best of Enemies; Cartel Land; Going Clear: Scientology and the Prison of Belief; He Named Me Malala; The Hunting Ground; National Lampoon: Drunk Stoned Brilliant Dead; Where to Invade Next	**Mad Max: Fury Road – John Seale**; Bridge of Spies – Janusz Kamiński; The Martian – Dariusz Wolski; The Revenant – Emmanuel Lubezki; Sicario – Roger Deakins; Spectre – Hoyte van Hoytema
Best Original Score	Best Original Song
**Carol – Carter Burwell**; The Danish Girl – Alexandre Desplat; Inside Out – Michael Giacchino; The Martian – Harry Gregson-Williams; Spectre – Thomas Newman; Spotlight – Howard Shore	**"Til It Happens to You" (Lady Gaga and Diane Warren) – The Hunting Ground**; "Cold One" (Jenny Lewis and Johnathan Rice) – Ricki and the Flash; "Love Me like You Do" (Max Martin, Savan Kotecha, Ilya Salmanzadeh, Ali Payami, and Tove Nilsson) – Fifty Shades of Grey; "One Kind of Love" (Brian Wilson) – Love & Mercy; "See You Again" (DJ Frank E, Charlie Puth, Wiz Khalifa, and Andrew Cedar) – Furious 7; "Writing's on the Wall" (Sam Smith and Jimmy Napes) – Spectre
Best Visual Effects	Best Art Direction and Production Design
**The Walk**; Everest; Jurassic World; Mad Max: Fury Road; The Martian; Spectre	**Bridge of Spies – Adam Stockhausen**; Cinderella – Dante Ferretti; The Danish Girl – Eve Stewart; Macbeth – Fiona Crombie; Mad Max: Fury Road – Colin Gibson; Spectre – Dennis Gassner
Best Film Editing	Best Sound (Editing and Mixing)
**Sicario – Joe Walker**; Bridge of Spies – Michael Kahn; Carol – Affonso Gonçalves; The Martian – Pietro Scalia; Spectre – Lee Smith; Steve Jobs – Elliot Graham	**The Martian**; Inside Out; Jurassic World; Mad Max: Fury Road; Sicario; Spectre
Best Costume Design	Best Ensemble – Motion Picture
**The Assassin – Wen-Ying Huang**; Cinderella – Sandy Powell; The Danish Girl – Paco Delgado; Far from the Madding Crowd – Janet Patterson; Macbeth – Jacqueline Durran; The Throne – Hyun-seob Shim	**Spotlight – Brian d'Arcy James, Michael Keaton, Rachel McAdams, Mark Ruffalo,** **Liev Schreiber, John Slattery, and Stanley Tucci**

== Television winners and nominees ==
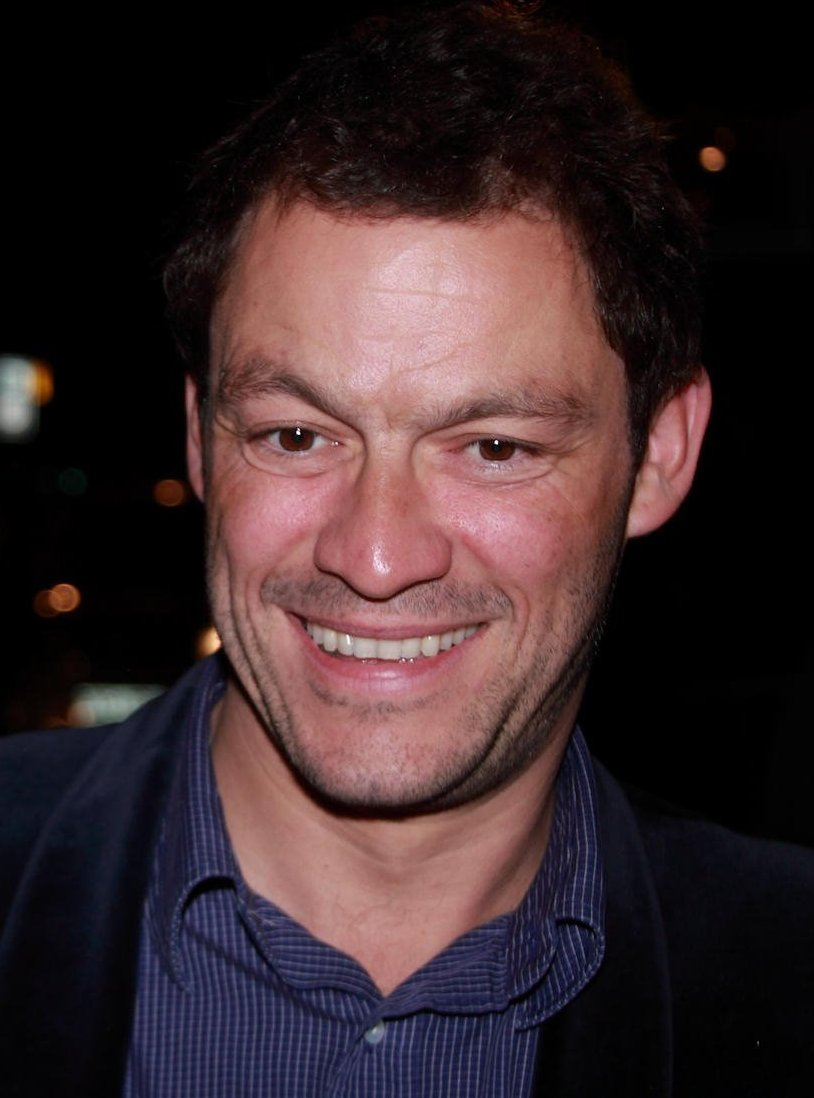
Dominic West, Best Actor in a Drama Series winner

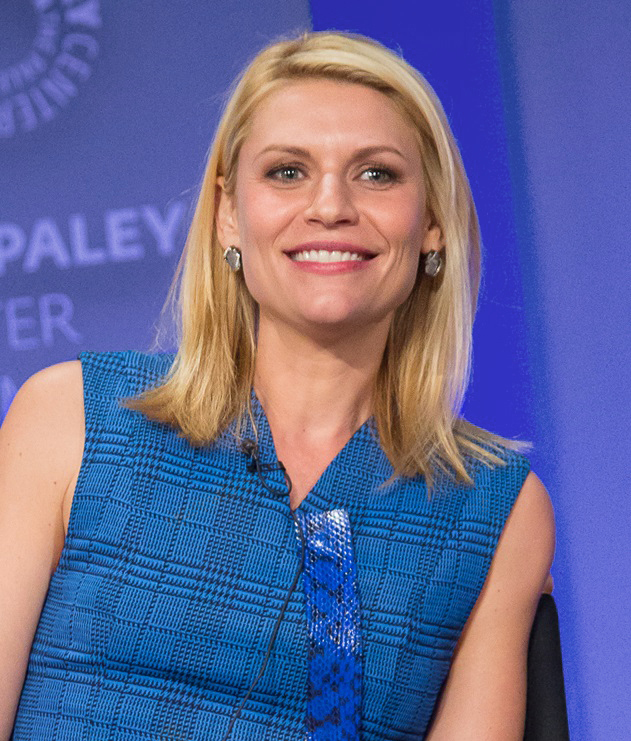
Claire Danes, Best Actress in a Drama Series winner

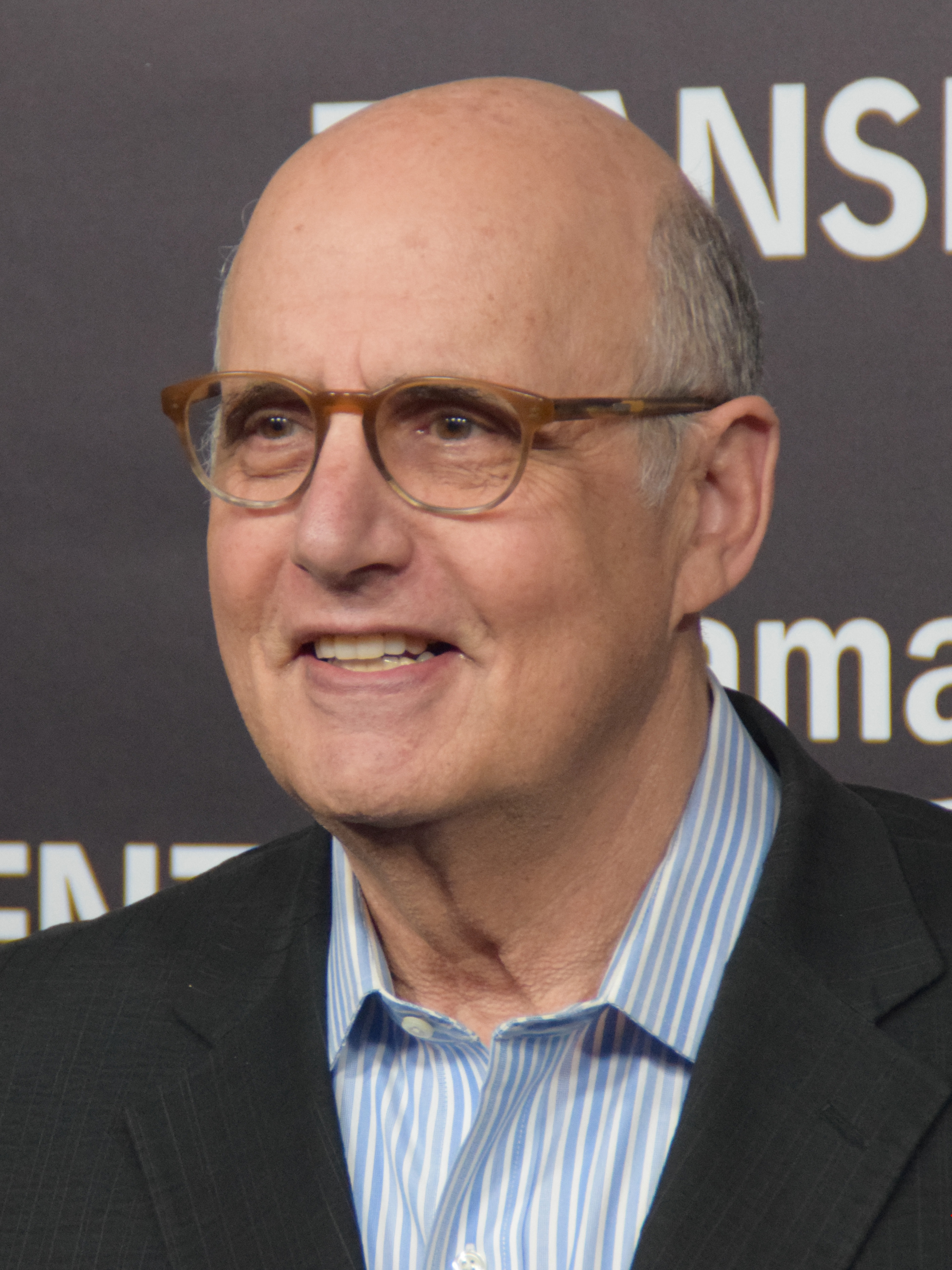
Jeffrey Tambor, Best Actor in a Comedy or Musical Series winner

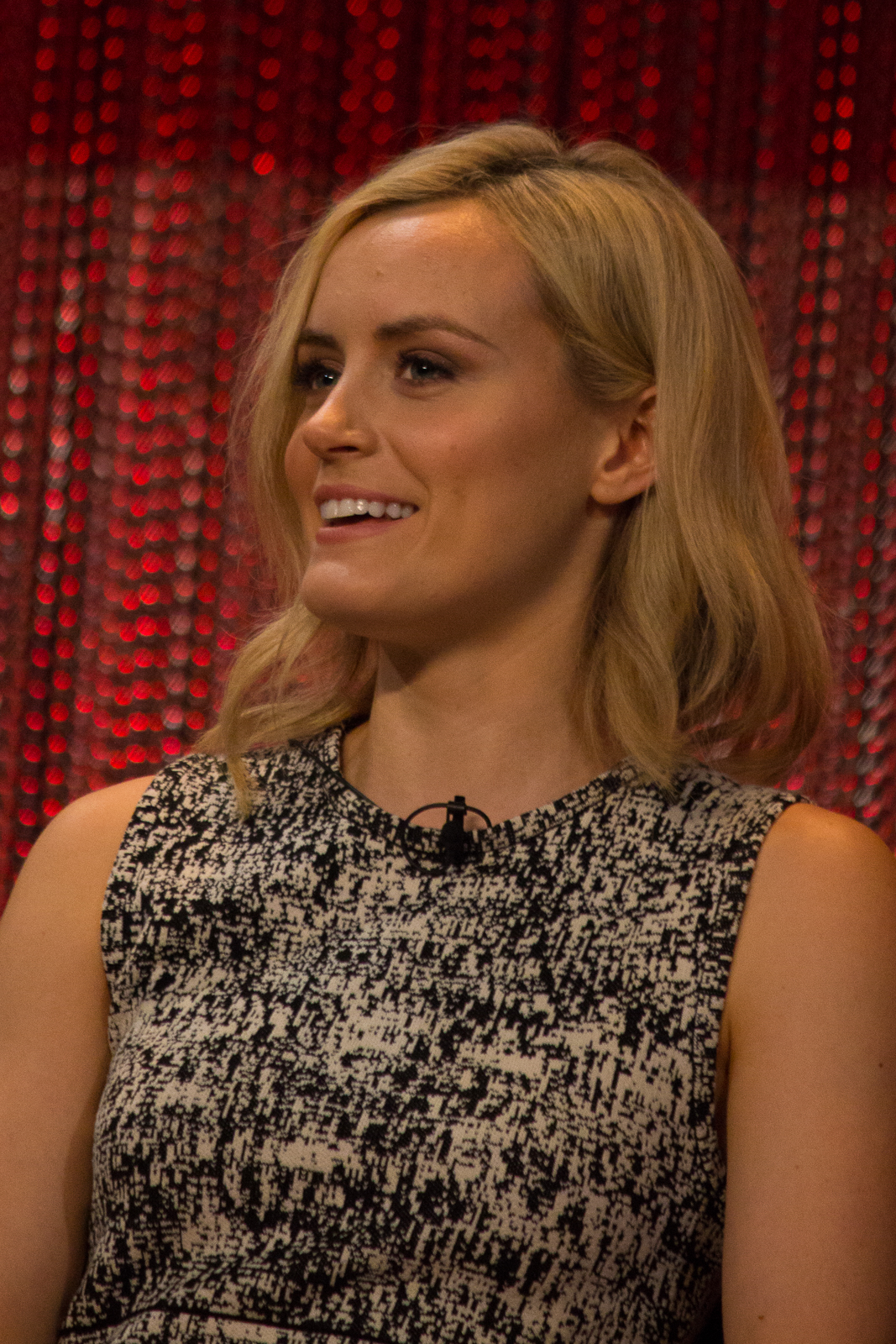
Taylor Schilling, Best Actress in a Comedy or Musical Series winner

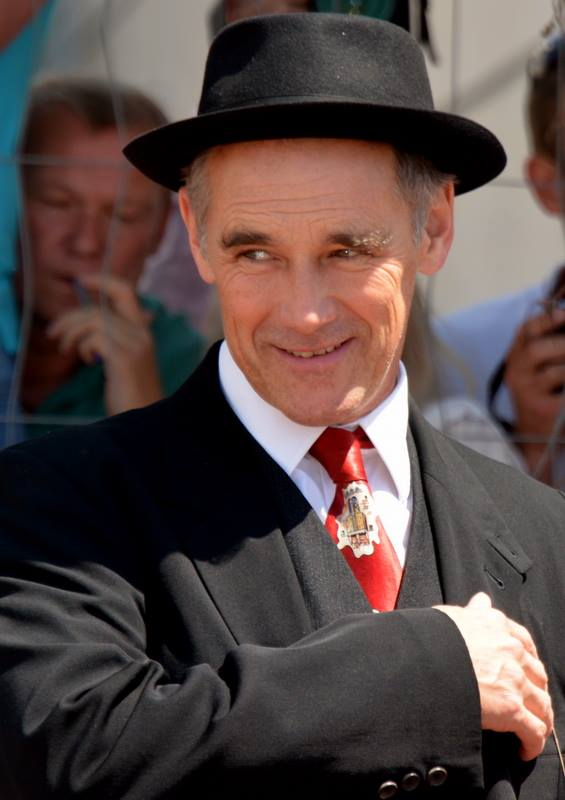
Mark Rylance, Best Actor in a Miniseries or Television Film winner

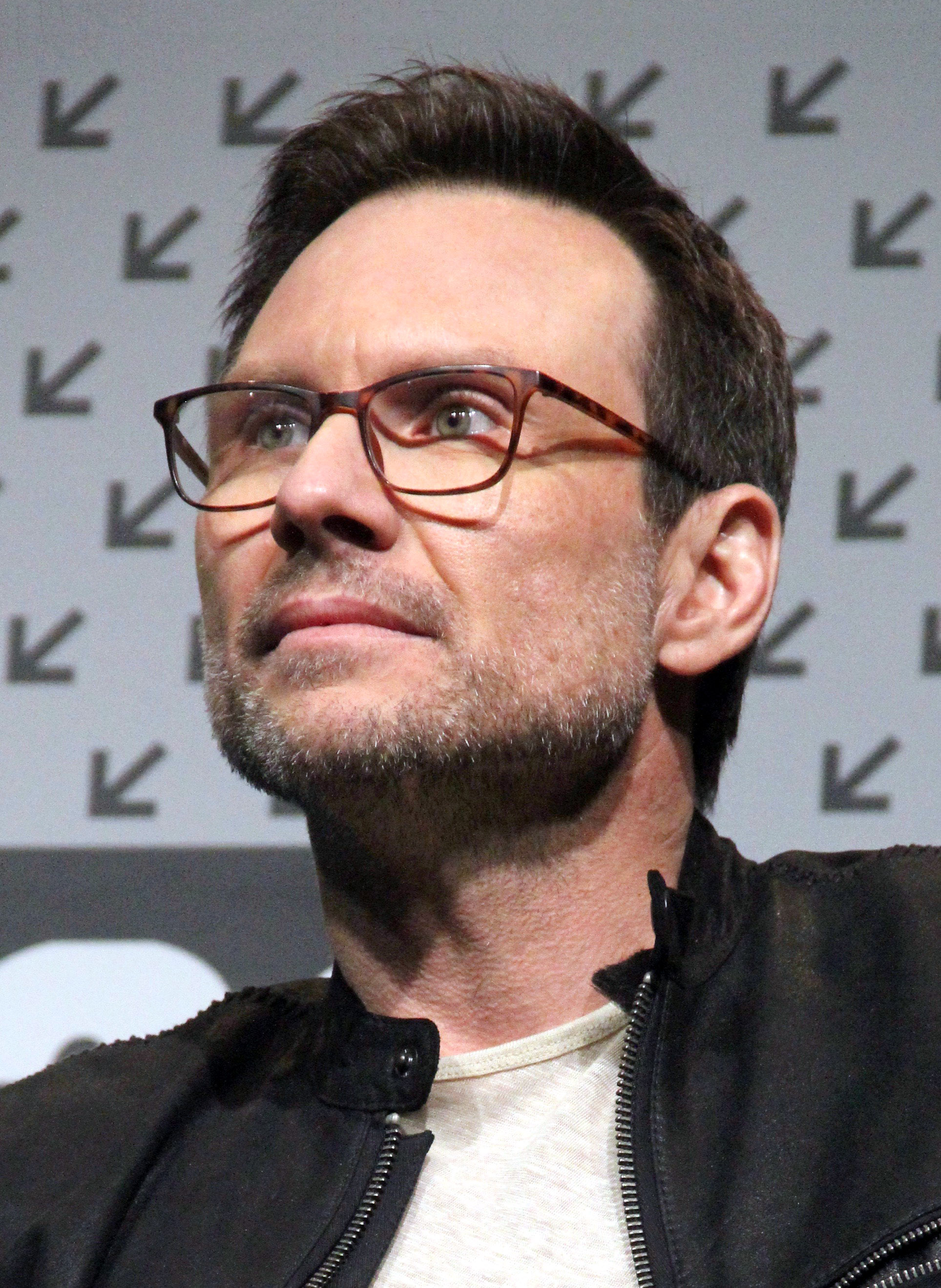
Christian Slater, Best Supporting Actor in a Series, Miniseries, or Television Film winner

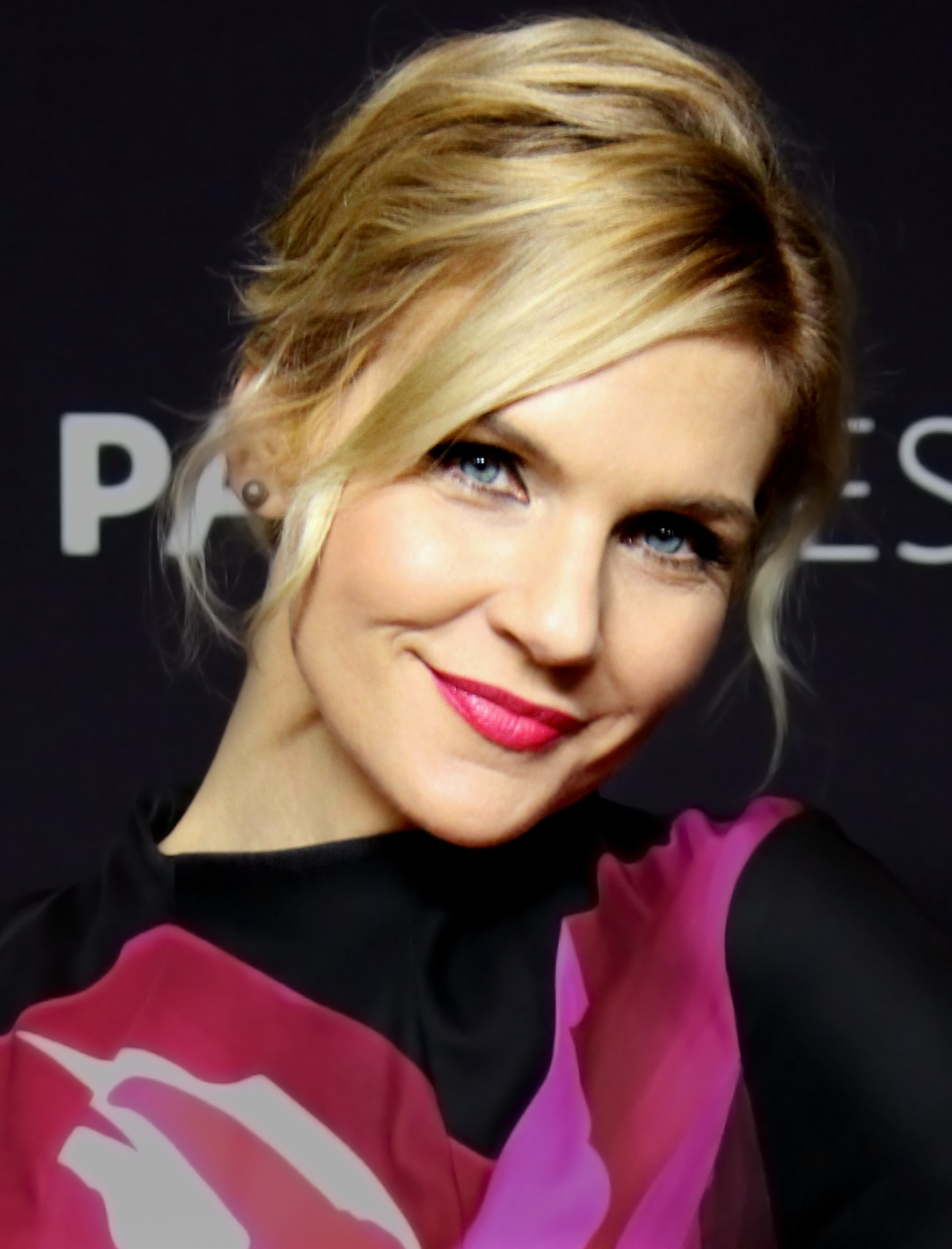
Rhea Seehorn, Best Supporting Actress in a Series, Miniseries, or Television Film winner

Winners are listed first and highlighted in bold.

Best Drama Series	Best Musical or Comedy Series
**Better Call Saul – AMC**; American Crime – ABC; Bloodline – Netflix; Deutschland 83 – Sundance TV; Fargo – FX; Mr. Robot – USA Network; Narcos – Netflix; Ray Donovan – Showtime	**Silicon Valley – HBO**; Brooklyn Nine-Nine – Fox; Jane the Virgin – The CW; Sex & Drugs & Rock & Roll – FX; The Spoils Before Dying – IFC; Unbreakable Kimmy Schmidt – Netflix; Veep – HBO
Best Miniseries	Best Television Film
**Flesh and Bone – Starz**; The Book of Negroes – BET; Saints & Strangers – Nat Geo; Show Me a Hero – HBO; Wolf Hall – BBC Two / PBS	**Stockholm, Pennsylvania – Lifetime**; Bessie – HBO; Killing Jesus – Nat Geo; Nightingale – HBO
Best Actor in a Drama Series	Best Actress in a Drama Series
**Dominic West – The Affair as Noah Solloway**; Kyle Chandler – Bloodline as John Rayburn; Timothy Hutton – American Crime as Russ Skokie; Rami Malek – Mr. Robot as Elliot Alderson; Bob Odenkirk – Better Call Saul as Jimmy McGill; Liev Schreiber – Ray Donovan as Ray Donovan	**Claire Danes – Homeland as Carrie Mathison**; Kirsten Dunst – Fargo as Peggy Blumquist; Lady Gaga – American Horror Story: Hotel as Elizabeth Johnson / The Countess; Taraji P. Henson – Empire as Cookie Lyon; Felicity Huffman – American Crime as Barbara "Barb" Hanlon; Tatiana Maslany – Orphan Black as Various Characters; Robin Wright – House of Cards as Claire Underwood
Best Actor in a Musical or Comedy Series	Best Actress in a Musical or Comedy Series
**Jeffrey Tambor – Transparent as Maura Pfefferman**; Louis C.K. – Louie as Louie; Will Forte – The Last Man on Earth as Phil Miller; Colin Hanks – Life in Pieces as Greg Short; Chris Messina – The Mindy Project as Dr. Danny Castellano; Thomas Middleditch – Silicon Valley as Richard Hendriks	**Taylor Schilling – Orange Is the New Black as Piper Chapman**; Jamie Lee Curtis – Scream Queens as Dean / Dr. Cathy Munsch; Julia Louis-Dreyfus – Veep as President Selina Meyer; Amy Poehler – Parks and Recreation as Leslie Knope; Gina Rodriguez – Jane the Virgin as Jane Gloriana Villanueva; Lily Tomlin – Grace and Frankie as Frankie Bergstein
Best Actor in a Miniseries or TV Film	Best Actress in a Miniseries or TV Film
**Mark Rylance – Wolf Hall as Thomas Cromwell**; Martin Clunes – Arthur & George as Arthur Conan Doyle; Michael Gambon – The Casual Vacancy as Howard Mollison; Oscar Isaac – Show Me a Hero as Nick Wasicsko; Damian Lewis – Wolf Hall as Henry VIII of England; Ben Mendelsohn – Bloodline as Danny Rayburn; David Oyelowo – Nightingale as Peter Snowden	**Sarah Hay – Flesh and Bone as Claire Robbins**; Samantha Bond – Home Fires as Frances Barden; Aunjanue Ellis – The Book of Negroes as Aminata Diallo; Claire Foy – Wolf Hall as Anne Boleyn; Queen Latifah – Bessie as Bessie Smith; Cynthia Nixon – Stockholm, Pennsylvania as Marcy Dargon
Best Supporting Actor in a Series, Miniseries or TV Film	Best Supporting Actress in a Series, Miniseries or TV Film
**Christian Slater – Mr. Robot as Mr. Robot**; Jonathan Banks – Better Call Saul as Mike Ehrmantraut; Peter Dinklage – Game of Thrones as Tyrion Lannister; Elvis Nolasco – American Crime as Carter Nix; Michael K. Williams – Bessie as Jack Gee	**Rhea Seehorn – Better Call Saul as Kim Wexler**; Catherine Keener – Show Me a Hero as Mary Dorman; Regina King – American Crime as Aliyah Shadeed; Helen McCrory – Penny Dreadful as Evelyn Poole; Mo'Nique – Bessie as Ma Rainey; Julie Walters – Indian Summers as Cynthia Coffin
Best Genre Series	Best Ensemble – Television Series
**The Walking Dead – AMC**; American Horror Story: Hotel – FX; Game of Thrones – HBO; Humans – AMC; Into the Badlands – AMC; Jonathan Strange & Mr Norrell – BBC America / BBC One; The Leftovers – HBO; Orphan Black – BBC America; Penny Dreadful – Showtime	**American Crime (ABC) – W. Earl Brown, Richard Cabral, Caitlin Gerard,** **Felicity Huffman, Timothy Hutton, Regina King, Benito Martinez,** **Penelope Ann Miller, Elvis Nolasco, and Johnny Ortiz**

== New Media winners and nominees ==
Outstanding Action/Adventure Game	Outstanding Blu-ray
Rise of the Tomb Raider – (Crystal Dynamics, Eidos Montréal, Microsoft Studios, Nixxes Software, Square Enix); Call of Duty: Black Ops III – (Beenox, Mercenary Technology, Raven Software, Treyarch); Fallout 4 – (Bethesda Game Studios); Halo 5: Guardians – (343 Industries, Microsoft Studios); The Room Three – (Fireproof Studios); Star Wars Battlefront – (EA Digital Illusions CE, Lucasfilm); The Witcher 3: Wild Hunt – (BNEI, CD Projekt Red, Spike Chunsoft, Warner Bros. Interactive Entertainment)	Downton Abbey: Season 6; Downton Abbey: Season 5; Inside Out; Masterpiece: Worricker – The Complete Series

== Multiple winners ==
=== Film ===
- 4 – Spotlight

=== Television ===
- 2 – Better Call Saul / Flesh and Bone
