= The Last Song =

The Last Song may refer to:

== Film, television, and literature ==
- The Last Song (1942 film), a Hungarian drama film directed by Frigyes Bán
- The Last Song (1980 film), an American television film directed by Alan J. Levi
- The Last Song (2010 film), an adaptation of a novel by Nicholas Sparks, directed by Julie Anne Robinson
- The Last Song (TV series), a British television series written by Carla Lane
- The Last Song (novel), a 2009 novel by Nicholas Sparks

== Songs ==
- "Last Song" (Edward Bear song), 1972
- "Last Song" (Gackt song), 2003
- "The Last Song" (The All-American Rejects song), 2002
- "The Last Song" (Brian Wilson song), 2015
- "The Last Song" (Elton John song), 1992
- "The Last Song" (Luv' song), 1991
- "The Last Song" (Poison song), 2000
- "The Last Song" (X Japan song), 1998
- "Last Song", by Carpark North from Grateful, 2008
- "Last Song", by Marianne Faithfull from Before the Poison, 2005
- "Last Song", by Meredith Monk from Impermanence, 2008
- "The Last Song", by Foo Fighters from In Your Honor, 2005
- "The Last Song", by Hilary Duff from Hilary Duff, 2004
- "The Last Song", by Iggy Azalea from Ignorant Art, 2011
- "The Last Song", by JLS from Outta This World, 2010
- "The Last Song", by McFly from Radio:Active, 2008
- "The Last Song", by Rihanna from Rated R, 2009
- "The Last Song", by Sevendust from Next, 2005
- "The Last Song", by the Smashing Pumpkins, a B-side of the single "Thirty-Three", 1996
- "The Last Song", by Theory of a Deadman from Theory of a Deadman, 2002
