= No Pier Pressure =

2015 studio album by Brian Wilson

Studio album by Brian Wilson
- Released: April 7, 2015
- Recorded: Early 2013 – November 2014
- Genre: Soft rock
- Length: 42:55
- Label: Capitol
- Producers: Brian Wilson, Joe Thomas

Brian Wilson chronology
The Big Beat 1963 (2013)	No Pier Pressure (2015)	Sessions '64 (2015)

Singles from No Pier Pressure
- 1. "The Right Time" Released: February 17, 2015; 2. "Runaway Dancer" Released: March 17, 2015; 3. "On the Island" Released: March 31, 2015

No Pier Pressure is the tenth studio album by American musician Brian Wilson, released on April 7, 2015, by Capitol Records. Originally planned as a follow-up to the Beach Boys' 2012 reunion album That's Why God Made the Radio, No Pier Pressure is the first solo Wilson LP devoted primarily to new and original material since That Lucky Old Sun (2008). It features guest performances by contemporary artists Sebu Simonian of Capital Cities, Kacey Musgraves, She & Him, Nate Ruess of Fun and Peter Hollens. Original Beach Boys members Al Jardine and David Marks also feature alongside former band member Blondie Chaplin.

Peaking at number 28 on the US Billboard 200, the album received mixed reviews which largely criticized its adult contemporary arrangements, production and auto-tune – directions which were allegedly at the behest of co-producer Joe Thomas, who previously co-produced That's Why God Made the Radio. The track "One Kind of Love" was written for the film Love & Mercy, a biopic of Wilson's life, and was nominated for Best Original Song at the 2016 Golden Globe Awards. It served as Wilson's final studio album of all-new original material, though he released one more original song, entitled “Right Where I Belong”, on the soundtrack album for Brian Wilson: Long Promised Road (2021).

== Background ==
Wilson intended to record with the Beach Boys after their 50th anniversary celebration, but decided to make a solo album instead. On June 6, 2013, Wilson's website announced that he was recording and self-producing new material with guitarist Jeff Beck, session musician/producer Don Was, as well as fellow Beach Boys Al Jardine, David Marks, and Blondie Chaplin. On June 20, the website announced that the material might be split into three albums: one of new pop songs, another of mostly instrumental tracks with Beck, and another of interwoven tracks dubbed "the suite" which initially began form as the closing four tracks of That's Why God Made The Radio.

Wilson embarked on a short summer tour which included Jardine and Marks. It was then announced on August 5, 2013 that Wilson would embark on a fall 2013 tour with Beck. According to Beck, "Brian will kick things off, but I'll also be given enough time to establish what I'm about. In the end, we'll mix and match. It's a complete honor to be on stage with him." Jardine and Marks also joined Wilson on the eighteen dates which began on September 27 and ended on October 30. Chaplin guested on some dates and performed "Sail On, Sailor" and "Wild Honey" with the group. That October, Wilson informed: "[We're] about two-thirds of the way through. We have eight or nine songs done, and we need three or four more songs. Most of it is very mellow kind of stuff, mellow harmony, not very much rock 'n' roll yet. It's a pretty unique album. It's very different than anything I've ever done.""

The album's cover was shot by Wilson's daughter, Daria.

== Recording and production ==
Sessions were conducted at all three studio spaces at Ocean Way Recording, Hollywood over a period of about a year-and-a-half. Senior staff engineer Wesley Seidman worked with Wilson in the studio, who preferred tracking band performances on ProTools while using vintage equipment. Accordingly, a batch of new super-high-fidelity C0-100K Sanken microphones were brought out for sessions, being used for drum overheads, orchestra and horn rooms, a mandolin, and acoustic lap steel guitar. In August 2014, Wilson said that recording was done and that he had reached the album's mixing process. Some portions of the album were recorded or mixed at other California, Tennessee, and Illinois studios. On November 6, 2014, the album was reported finished. He later said that his wife Melinda Ledbetter contributed to the production.

== Music and lyrics ==
That's Why God Made the Radio and Imagination collaborator Joe Thomas was involved to some extent. Accordingly, "When we started working on this thing, he was calling it his life's suite. He looked at life as three different movements. One was Pet Sounds, the other was Smile and then, he wanted to go out with a bang and have a look back at life from an adult. Pet Sounds was when he was just a kid. Smile was when he was a little more savvy and in the business awhile. [sic] And now, this is a guy looking back at life and where he is now, which is in a much happier and less chaotic state." Thomas, comparing the record to That's Why God Made the Radio, stated: "Musically, it has a rougher edge to it. The harmonies are cool, but it's more akin to the music on Wild Honey and the Carl & the Passions records ... This new material is not a reprise to that album at all; it's taking it further."

Announced song titles included "Right Time" and "Run James Run", which both feature lead vocals by Al Jardine, along with "On the Island", "Special Love", "Sharing a New Day", "Guess You Had to Be There", "Sail Away", and "Last Song". Wilson stated that "Sail Away", "Runaway Dancer", "On the Island", and "Guess You Had to Be There" were his favorite tracks on the album.

Jardine spoke of "Run, James, Run" as a "suped-up 'Little Deuce Coupe' kind of thing. It's just cute as hell." "Run James Run" was ultimately released in 2017 with Wilson on lead vocals on the 2017 compilation Playback: The Brian Wilson Anthology. "Runaway Dancer" was written and initially recorded in 1998 (as "Talk Of The Town"): the album version is a new recording. On "Sail Away", co-writer Jim Peterik said: "Again it was myself, Brian Wilson, Joe Thomas the producer and Larry Millas of the Ides of March. It's kind of like 'Sloop John B' in the nautical field, so it's continuing. I still pinch myself with the Brian Wilson thing."

The album's centerpiece, "The Last Song," is described: "A heartbreaking ballad that was recorded in two versions — one with a haunting vocal by [Lana] Del Rey and one with Wilson's lead vocals. The song recounts his sadness about the Beach Boys' dissolution." Don Was commented, "Brian's really on it. I was knocked out by a couple of songs on that last Beach Boys record – 'Summer's Gone' ranks with his greatest work. I didn't expect that he's got a whole other album of stuff on that level ... I got really choked up playing bass on that track. There's something about Brian signing off with it, saying, 'This is it, this is my last song.' It's really intense. If 'Last Song' turned out to be his last song, can you imagine? Wow. That'd be some coda."

=== Guest performers ===
In July 2014, Wilson announced potential guest appearances by Lana Del Rey ("Last Song"), Zooey Deschanel ("On the Island"), Frank Ocean ("Special Love"), and Kacey Musgraves ("Sharing a New Day", "Guess You Had to Be There"). The news brought mixed feedback from fans; Wilson is purported to have expressed through his Facebook page: "It kind of bums me out to see some of the negativity here about the album I've been working so hard on. In my life in music, I've been told too many times not to fuck with the formula, but as an artist it's my job to do that – and I think I've earned that right ... So let's just wait until the album comes out because I think you just might dig it as much as I do." Thomas has asserted: "Brian isn't trying to write to a younger or older audience, he's telling the story from his perspective." Later, a guest appearance by Nate Ruess of Fun was also confirmed, and that Ocean's collaboration would be excluded, replaced by a remake of the Beach Boys' 1965 instrumental "Summer Means New Love".

According to Thomas, "We wanted our kids to think we were cool", explaining that Wilson's children were how Wilson had become aware of Ruess. "When you take the time to listen, there's a lot of talent out there. Then we'd cross-check everything with our kids."

Ocean and Del Rey's vocals were left unfinished due to scheduling conflicts, leaving them absent from the album's final assembly. Wilson explained "Frank Ocean didn't want to do the song. He wanted to do rap, so we canceled him. Lana Del Rey, uh, she just canceled out on us."

==== Aborted Wilson–Beck sessions ====
Thomas described the recording sessions between Wilson and Beck as "fusion jazz rock with Brian singing, 'oohs' and 'aahs.'" A version of the traditional "Danny Boy" was recorded between the duo. Beck described his contributions: "They let me take the melody wherever I wanted the flavor of them to go, but the fact is when you've got the backing of Brian's chords you automatically play West Coast-style guitar. It's just inbuilt into the essence of what he writes. You can't do anything far from it, so it's hard to wedge my style in there, but I've tried to do it as best I can." On Beck, Wilson said: "He really blew my mind, so we thought we'd have him join us on our album. He plays the most goddamn greatest guitar you've ever heard. He really brings quality notes, more notes per bar than you can imagine." Jardine intimated: "The combination of the two forces of music give it a certain breadth and depth that I think neither of us have experienced before. Jeff has a very melodic sense and is keenly aware of where the chord progressions are going, and it helps us to marry our voices to his progressions. We're doing some really innovative things."

In January 2014, Wilson clarified that he did not write any material with Beck, and that Beck would only be a guest performer. The next month, Beck intimated on the project's status: "I'm not sure. As far as I know, they made a mistake by grabbing me for a tour and opening up the floodgates for a tour prematurely instead of finishing the tracks. And so we left the studio with half-finished tracks–three, four tracks I was supposed to be on and they're still unfinished. And to me it was a bit stupid because they should have done the album, had a killer album, and then gone out on the road. But I think they wanted to grab me while I was still available. That's about it."

Six months later in July, Beck and Wilson's cover version of the traditional "Danny Boy" was said to be included for what is now evidently part of "aborted Wilson–Beck sessions". In August, Beck was surprised to learn that "Danny Boy" would be included on the album, reporting that the track was left unfinished with only a rough guitar track played by him. He maintained that Wilson hardly spoke to him during sessions, and that sometime after, Beck says, "I did go up to check out this deli in Benedict Canyon or Coldwater Canyon that he frequents. He goes to it regularly three times a day. And I heard about this ... recently, I went up there and sure enough within five minutes he walked in. And on the way out, I said, 'Hello, Brian,' he said, 'Hi!' And he walked straight past me [laughs]. It was like I never existed. We had never toured for five weeks. There's something not quite right." Later in the month, Wilson stated that the Beck collaborations would not be included, and that recording was complete.

In 2015, Wilson said of the project with Jeff Beck and Don Was: "We left it behind. It was OK. The songs weren't up to my standard so I did something else."

== Promotion ==
On December 12, 2014, album participants Al Jardine, Blondie Chaplin, Ricky Fataar, Nate Ruess, Sebu Simonian of Capital Cities, and jazz trumpeter Mark Isham were filmed performing with Wilson at The Venetian in Las Vegas for an episode of Soundstage which aired in 2015. In March 2015, Wilson announced a summer tour to support the album with Jardine and Chaplin, as well as feature Rodriguez as the opening act.

== Release ==
On September 28, 2014, "Our Special Love" was released by Peter Hollens on his self-titled album as a duet between him and Wilson. In February 2015, "Right Time" was released as a digital-only single, followed with "Runaway Dancer" and "On the Island" in March.

No Pier Pressure was released on April 7, 2015 on Capitol Records. It is distributed through the web and compact disc, while a deluxe edition and vinyl format is available with three bonus songs "Don't Worry", "Somewhere Quiet", and "I'm Feeling Sad". The bonus tracks on the compact disc release are "In the Back of My Mind" and "Love and Mercy".

"One Kind of Love", a song written for the film, appears in 2014 biopic Love & Mercy, based on Wilson's life.

== Reception ==
Professional ratings
Aggregate scores
Source	Rating
Metacritic	57/100
Review scores
Source	Rating
AllMusic	3/5 stars
Consequence of Sound	C−
Entertainment Weekly	B
Exclaim!	4/10
The Guardian	3/5 stars
Mojo	3/5 stars
Pitchfork Media	5.6/10
PopMatters	2/10 stars
Rolling Stone	3/5 stars
The Telegraph	4/5 stars

At Metacritic, which assigns a normalized rating out of 100 to reviews from critics, No Pier Pressure received an average score of 57 based on 23 reviews, indicating "mixed or average reviews". Repeated criticisms were made toward the track "Runaway Dancer" and the involvement of Joe Thomas as the album's co-producer who is allegedly responsible for coating the album's vocals in auto-tune. Two months after the album's release, Wilson denied using autotune in his work.

Rolling Stone gave the album 3 stars and said "There are missed opportunities — the She & Him track is slight, and a rumored Frank Ocean team-up is sadly absent — and a few too many retreads (the "Sloop John B"-ish "Sail Away"), although the harmonies do sound grand with Al Jardine and other Beach Boys teammates on board. Still, No Pier Pressure stands as Wilson's most forward-looking solo LP." Contactmusic.com described the album "full of nostalgia and is musically a world away from pop music in 2015", and that its strongest moments "recall Wilson's classic song writing", also praising the duets with Musgraves and Ruess." The Guardian named "The Last Song" the best track, "a wonderful arrangement and a desperately sad melody".

Now Magazine opined "The most frustrating part is that many of the songs are decent, but they're consistently compromised by the ham-fisted presentation." Exclaim! reviewed that "stacking the record with guest stars like Nate Ruess and Kacey Musgraves and 'updating' Wilson's compositions with heaps of undercooked stylistic diversions" effectively made the Beach Boy "a sideshow to his own record." On "Runaway Dancer", Contactmusic.com wrote: "It's all processed vocals and dance floor beats with a giant pop chorus. It feels completely separate from the rest of the record, but as it's the second track, you're left with a creeping sense of doubt as the album progresses as to whether more oddities in the same vein will follow, thankfully they don't." The Guardian expressed that "Runaway Dancer" sounds like "Wilson trying to recreate house music as described to him by Alan Partridge". Glide referred to it as "utter dreck coming from the guy who penned 'Surf's Up.'"

Rebeat noted Joe Thomas' "middle-of-the-road musical sensibilities and penchant for auto-tune" and reported "varied" results, writing: "There's plenty of beauty sprinkled throughout, but the listener has to endure a lot of adult contemporary cheese and head-scratching moments to get to that beauty. In other words, it's a latter-day Brian Wilson album, and it's sure to keep Wilson's fans talking – and arguing – for some time to come." The Arts Desk echoed similarly: "Joe Thomas, whose MOR tendencies are all over this LP like a disfiguring rash ... [it suffers] from the sort of production values normally reserved for karaoke bars and cheap restaurants." AllMusic stated in comparison to Smile (2004) and That Lucky Old Sun (2008), "No Pier Pressure certainly doesn't have much to do with the high art that's marked Wilson's new millennium" and concludes that the album "seems genuinely weird, as it's perilously perched between the best and worst of Wilson's pop talent and Thomas' showbiz instincts." In a review by Tiny Mix Tapes which analyzed the album's lyrics, it was named "artistically bankrupt". Glide posited that "Wilson's joint experiments with other artists do feel very much like giving into, yes, peer pressure, with his sound being pulled in all sorts of wrong directions. On the other, when he sticks to what he does best, he comes up with mere rehashes of everything he's done before."

Believing that Wilson's true involvement with the album was minimal, PopMatters gave the album a 2 out of 10, elaborating "... discussing the album's tracks as if they were actually Wilson's becomes completely pointless. This may have his elderly vocals on it, but this is his album in name only. ... [Wilson] doesn't know who [his guest performers] are, nor should he. The aforementioned Thomas does know who those people are, and he brings them on here basically to bring some media attention to a collection of limp, lifeless songs." The publication also responded to positive reviews by Rolling Stone, The Telegraph, and The Guardian, urging them to "stop encouraging this! Don't give the people at Capitol Records or Joe Thomas any reason to bring Wilson out for any more obligatory solo albums or collaborations, and let this legend carry on in peace."

=== Accolades ===
From 285 films featured in the 2015 Nashville Film Festival, "One Kind of Love" earned Love & Mercy the award for "Best Original Song".

== Track listing ==
=== Compact disc and web ===
All tracks are written by Brian Wilson and Joe Thomas, except where otherwise stated.

Standard edition
No.	Title	Writer(s)	Length
1.	"This Beautiful Day"		1:24
2.	"Runaway Dancer" (featuring Sebu Simonian)	Wilson, Thomas, Sebu Simonian	3:58
3.	"What Ever Happened" (featuring Al Jardine and David Marks)		2:51
4.	"On the Island" (featuring She & Him)		2:14
5.	"Half Moon Bay" (featuring Mark Isham)		3:22
6.	"Our Special Love" (featuring Peter Hollens)		3:43
7.	"The Right Time" (featuring Jardine and Marks)		2:54
8.	"Guess You Had to Be There" (featuring Kacey Musgraves)	Wilson, Thomas, Andrew Salgado, Kacey Musgraves	3:23
9.	"Tell Me Why" (featuring Jardine)		3:40
10.	"Sail Away" (featuring Blondie Chaplin and Jardine)	Wilson, Jim Peterik, Larry Millas, Thomas	3:42
11.	"One Kind of Love"	Wilson, Scott Bennett	3:34
12.	"Saturday Night" (featuring Nate Ruess)	Wilson, Thomas, Nate Ruess	3:30
13.	"The Last Song"		4:36
Total length:			42:55

Deluxe edition
No.	Title	Writer(s)	Length
1.	"This Beautiful Day"		1:24
2.	"Runaway Dancer" (featuring Sebu Simonian)	Wilson, Thomas, Sebu Simonian	3:58
3.	"What Ever Happened" (featuring Al Jardine and David Marks)		2:51
4.	"On the Island" (featuring She & Him)		2:14
5.	"Half Moon Bay" (featuring Mark Isham)		3:22
6.	"Our Special Love" (featuring Peter Hollens)		3:43
7.	"The Right Time" (featuring Jardine and Marks)		2:54
8.	"Guess You Had to Be There" (featuring Kacey Musgraves)	Wilson, Thomas, Andrew Salgado, Kacey Musgraves	3:23
9.	"Don't Worry"		2:42
10.	"Somewhere Quiet"	Wilson, Scott Bennett	3:02
11.	"I'm Feeling Sad"		2:17
12.	"Tell Me Why" (featuring Jardine)		3:40
13.	"Sail Away" (featuring Blondie Chaplin and Jardine)	Wilson, Jim Peterik, Larry Millas, Thomas	3:42
14.	"One Kind of Love"	Wilson, Bennett	3:34
15.	"Saturday Night" (featuring Nate Ruess)	Wilson, Thomas, Nate Ruess	3:30
16.	"The Last Song"		4:36
Total length:			51:03

Deluxe edition, Target-exclusive bonus tracks
No.	Title	Writer(s)	Length
17.	"In the Back of My Mind" (1975 recording)	Brian Wilson, Mike Love
18.	"Love and Mercy"	Wilson

=== Vinyl ===
Side one
No.	Title	Length
1.	"This Beautiful Day"	1:24
2.	"Runaway Dancer" (featuring Sebu Simonian)	3:58
3.	"Saturday Night" (featuring Nate Ruess)	3:30
4.	"On the Island" (featuring She & Him)	2:14

Side two
No.	Title	Length
1.	"The Right Time" (featuring Alan Jardine and David Marks)	2:54
2.	"What Ever Happened" (featuring Jardine and Marks)	2:51
3.	"Guess You Had to Be There" (featuring Kacey Musgraves)	3:23
4.	"Tell Me Why" (featuring Jardine)	3:40

Side three
No.	Title	Length
1.	"Don't Worry"	2:42
2.	"One Kind of Love"	3:34
3.	"Sail Away" (featuring Blondie Chaplin and Jardine)	3:42
4.	"The Last Song"	4:36

Side four
No.	Title	Length
1.	"I'm Feeling Sad"	2:17
2.	"Somewhere Quiet"	3:02
3.	"Half Moon Bay" (featuring Mark Isham)	3:22
4.	"Our Special Love" (featuring Peter Hollens)	3:43

== Personnel ==
From the album's liner notes.

The Brian Wilson Band

- Brian Wilson – lead vocals, background vocals, acoustic piano, Hammond B-3 organ, additional keyboards, producer, arranger, additional mixing
- Nick Walusko – acoustic guitar, additional engineer
- Darian Sahanaja – acoustic piano, B3 organ, vibraphone, additional engineer
- Matt Jardine – background vocals
- Scott Bennett – background vocals, percussion, acoustic piano, Hammond B-3 organ, vibraphone
- Jeff Foskett – background vocals
- Probyn Gregory – French horn, acoustic guitar
- Nelson Bragg – percussion
- Bob Lizik – bass guitar
- Gary Griffin – accordion, additional engineer
- Paul Von Mertens – saxophone, flute, bass harmonica, conductor/arranger

Guests

- Sebu Simonian – lead vocals and background vocals on “Runaway Dancer”, accordion and additional keyboards on “Runaway Dancer”, additional production and mixing on “Runaway Dancer”
- Al Jardine – lead vocals and background vocals on “Whatever Happened”, “The Right Time”, “Tell Me Why” and “Sail Away”
- Blondie Chaplin – lead vocals and background vocals on “Sail Away”
- Zooey Deschanel – lead vocals and background vocals on “On The Island”
- Peter Hollens – lead vocals and background vocals on “Our Special Love”
- Kacey Musgraves – lead vocals and background vocals on “Guess You Had To Be There”
- Nate Ruess – lead vocals and background vocals on “Saturday Night”
- M. Ward – acoustic guitar on “On The Island”
- David Marks – electric guitar on “Whatever Happened” and “The Right Time”
- Mark Isham – flugelhorn and trumpet on “This Beautiful Day” and “Half Moon Bay”

Additional musicians

- Thom Griffin – background vocals
- Jimmy Riley – background vocals, acoustic guitar
- Dean Parks – acoustic guitar
- Richie Davis – acoustic guitar
- Mark Goldenberg – acoustic guitar
- Tom Bukovac – acoustic guitar
- Don Was – bass guitar
- Michael Rhodes – bass guitar
- Zach Dawes – bass guitar
- Brett Simons – bass guitar
- Shane Soloski – bass guitar
- Jeff Lantz – additional keyboards
- Jim Keltner – drums
- Vinnie Colaiuta – drums
- Kenny Aronoff – drums
- Chad Cromwell – drums
- Eddie Bayers – drums
- Wayne Bergeron – trumpet
- Larry Hall – trumpet
- Tim Bales – trumpet
- Bob Parton – trumpet
- Carey Deadman – trumpet
- Charles Morallis – trombone
- Dave Stahlberg – trombone
- Tom Garlin – trombone
- John Mason – French horn
- Amy Barwan – oboe, English horn
- Peter Kent – concertmaster
- Chihsuan Yang – violin
- Sharon Jackson – violin
- Clayton Haslop – violin
- John Wittenberg – violin
- Songa Lee – violin
- Amy Wickman – violin
- Mark Robertson – violin
- Julie Rogers – violin
- Marisa Kuney – violin
- Charlie Bisharat – violin
- Scott Hosfeld – viola
- Briana Bandy – viola
- Caroline Buckman – viola
- Darrin McCann – viola
- JoAnn Tominaga – viola
- Jill Kaeding – cello
- Cameron Stone – cello
- Alisha Bauer – cello
- Giovanna Clayton – cello
- Vanessa Freebairn Smith – cello
- Joey Gryzyb – accordion

Technical staff

- Joe Thomas – producer, additional mixing, acoustic piano, Hammond B-3 organ, additional keyboards
- Bob Clearmountain – mixer
- Frank Papplardo – recording, additional mixing
- Wesley M. Seidman – recording, additional mixing
- Bill Hare – recording, additional mixing
- Sergio Relas Jr. – additional engineer
- Larry Millas – additional engineer
- Mike Czazwics – additional engineer
- Nick Rowe – additional engineer
- Andrew Twiss – additional engineer
- Bob Ludwig – mastering
- Mike Marsh – mastering ("Runaway Dancer")

== Charts ==
Chart (2015)	Peak position
Australian Albums (ARIA)	98
Belgian Albums (Ultratop Flanders)	80
Dutch Albums (Album Top 100)	22
German Albums (Offizielle Top 100)	64
Scottish Albums (Official Charts)	24
Swedish Albums (Sverigetopplistan)	60
UK Albums (Official Charts)	25
US Billboard 200	28
