= Music from Love & Mercy =

Music from Love and Mercy

Film score / soundtrack album by Atticus Ross and various artists
- Released: August 14, 2015
- Recorded: 1960s–2010s
- Genres: Ambient, mashup
- Length: 38:29
- Label: Capitol

Atticus Ross chronology
| Gone Girl (2014) | Music from Love and Mercy (2015) |

Music from Love and Mercy is the soundtrack album to Bill Pohlad's film of the same name about the Beach Boys' songwriter-musician-producer and co-founder Brian Wilson. The album was released by Capitol Records on August 14, 2015. Selections from Atticus Ross's original film score were included in addition to song performances featured in the film. The closing track, "One Kind of Love", was written by Wilson specially for the film.

Pohlad has spoken that he envisioned the original score as a representation of Wilson's auditory hallucinations, which manifest to Wilson as complex sounds and disembodied voices. The resultant score was composed substantially from mashed up samples of Beach Boys songs, taking inspiration from the Beatles' "Revolution 9" (1968) and Danger Mouse's The Grey Album (2004).

== Background ==
Of Brian Wilson's music being incorporated in Love & Mercy, director Bill Pohlad initially clarified: "We're not thinking about this as the hit parade—that would be the biopic thing." English composer Atticus Ross was commissioned for an original score. Ross, who is selective about the films he works on, says he agreed to Love & Mercy because "I liked him [Pohlad] from the moment of meeting him. He’s a guy with vision and that’s what, as a musician, you need from the director. His company was built on making the kind of films that I would love to be working on." He added that he considers music films to have reached "a level of utter [garbage]," he says, "So I put off reading [the script], assuming those things, but then I did read it and I thought it was a brilliant script."

Pohlad confessed that while growing up, he was "kind of more of a Beatles guy", and only became interested in the Beach Boys much later in life. When asked, Ross said he believed Wilson was a genius. When questioned whether he was a fan of Wilson's music, Ross said no, but continues: "[I] was a fan in that [Wilson's] music is ingrained in you without you even knowing it. ... I feel like there is an element of cliche that has grown around it [Pet Sounds]." Commenting on what he learned from working with Wilson's music: "It was an education in being a musician. Nowadays, not to sound like an old fart, but you're lucky if you get a chord change. There's plenty of songs that we all sing along to, pop songs of Brian's, that have several key changes in them. He was able to deliver them in a way that it doesn't feel like a complicated piece of music until you break it down, and then you realize that it's incredibly complicated."

== Development ==
Ross and Pohlad worked on the score for about half a year. Pohlad explained: "Brian hears these amazing orchestrations and harmonies and arrangements in his head that are so complex, nobody else can understand them until he actually executes them. They're these amazingly, you know, layered things. The problem is he hears them all the time and he can't turn them off necessarily. That ocean of kind of being the genius as well as the madness really intrigued me. ... I really wanted to be able to try to get to that and to try to represent that in some way." He did not want to incorporate a conventional score that was a fan's "tribute" to Wilson: "Atticus got that right away. You're not going to try to compete with Brian Wilson. So he had the idea — because we had access to all of Brian's original music and the original tapes and stems and tracks from these recordings. So we started talking about rearranging those. He would take them and combine them in different ways and we'd mix them and things to create new music that essentially was Brian's music." Pohlad said that it was "Revolution 9" (1968) from the Beatles' White Album which inspired this approach. Ross also took inspiration from the Beatles and Jay-Z mashup album The Grey Album (2004).

The Beach Boys' original multitrack stems were then delivered to Ross in hard drives. This included all the master tapes to Pet Sounds and what Ross claimed to be "92 versions of 'Good Vibrations'". Ross felt it was necessary that the real Wilson was present in some way musically throughout the movie. This was achieved by writing original pieces wherein samples of Wilson's voice and Beach Boys instrumentation could then be digitally retuned to create new melodies. Another way to keep Wilson present was through the method of sound collage; one composition uses elements from as many as eight of Wilson's Beach Boys songs simultaneously. Ross explained, "The funny thing is these moments flash by in the film in probably a minute, but it took, you know, 10 days or something to get right." On a section that features voices from "God Only Knows", Ross retrieved a scrapped melody from an earlier version of the song that went unused on the final mix.

== Samples ==
Information sourced from the film's credits.

- "Black Hole" – "Don't Worry Baby", "California Girls", "Good to My Baby", "Help Me, Rhonda", "Wendy", "Dance, Dance, Dance", "Denny's Drums", "Fun, Fun, Fun"
- "End Date" – "Don't Talk (Put Your Head on My Shoulder)"
- "Believe" – "You Still Believe in Me", "Don't Talk (Put Your Head on My Shoulder)", "Pet Sounds"
- "Silhouette" – "God Only Knows", "Let's Go Away for Awhile", "Don't Talk (Put Your Head on My Shoulder)", "Sloop John B"
- "Headphones" – "I Live for the Sun", "I Know There's An Answer", "Sloop John B", "Pet Sounds", "Dance, Dance, Dance", "Don't Talk (Put Your Head on My Shoulder)", "Help Me, Rhonda", "Here Today"
- "Knives and Forks" – "God Only Knows"
- "Deep End" – "Heroes and Villains", "Barnyard", "I Love to Say Da Da", "Wind Chimes", "Don't Worry Baby", "Our Prayer"
- "B&M Studio" – "Don't Talk (Put Your Head on My Shoulder)"
- "Baby No Morph" – "I Love to Say Da Da", "Here Today", "Don't Talk (Put Your Head on My Shoulder)"
- "Bed Montage" – "Don't Worry Baby", "In My Room", "California Girls", "'Til I Die"
- "Into Mercy" – "God Only Knows"

== Release ==
On September 19, 2014, Pohlad announced that the film's soundtrack would be released by Capitol Records sometime in the future, later reported for release in 2015. On June 2, 2015, Pohlad reported that there were complications but that the soundtrack should be released shortly after the film. On August 13, the digital global release date was announced for the following day.

== Reception ==
Variety found that Ross's "haunting score" resembled the sound of Animal Collective. HitFix wrote that within the film, the score is "both supportive and spare, never once overwhelming the movie or trying to ladle on cheap unearned sentiment."

== Track listing ==
Love & Mercy – The Life, Love and Genius of Brian Wilson (Original Motion Picture Soundtrack)
| No. | Title | Writer(s) | Artist(s) | Length |
|---|---|---|---|---|
| 1. | "The Black Hole" | Atticus Ross, Leopold Ross, Brian Wilson, Roger Christian, Mike Love, Carl Wilson & Dennis Wilson | Atticus Ross | 1:19 |
| 2. | "Don't Worry Baby" | B. Wilson & Christian | The Beach Boys | 2:47 |
| 3. | "Silhouette" | A. Ross, L. Ross, B. Wilson & Tony Asher | Atticus Ross | 2:07 |
| 4. | "God Only Knows" | B. Wilson, Asher | Paul Dano | 1:33 |
| 5. | "God Only Knows" | B. Wilson, Asher | The Beach Boys | 2:56 |
| 6. | "Believe" | A. Ross, L. Ross, Nicholas Holmes, B. Wilson & Asher | Atticus Ross | 4:39 |
| 7. | "Good Vibrations" | B. Wilson, Love | The Beach Boys | 3:37 |
| 8. | "Losing It" | A. Ross, B. Wilson & Tony Asher | Atticus Ross | 2:34 |
| 9. | "I'm Right Here" | A. Ross, L. Ross, B. Wilson & Asher | Atticus Ross | 4:06 |
| 10. | "The Bed Montage" | A. Ross, L. Ross, B. Wilson, Christian, Love, Sammy Cahn, Axel Stordahl, Paul Weston & Gary Usher | Atticus Ross, The Beach Boys, The Four Freshmen | 4:00 |
| 11. | "Intersection" | A. Ross, L. Ross, B. Wilson & Asher | Atticus Ross | 2:35 |
| 12. | "Love and Mercy" (Live at the Royal Festival Hall) | B. Wilson | Brian Wilson | 2:42 |
| 13. | "One Kind of Love" | B. Wilson & Scott Bennett | Brian Wilson | 3:34 |
| Total length: | | | | 38:29 |
