= The Last Song (Brian Wilson song) =

Song by Brian Wilson

from the album No Pier Pressure
- Released: April 7, 2015
- Genre: Soft rock
- Length: 4:36
- Label: Capitol
- Songwriters: Brian Wilson; Joe Thomas
- Producers: Brian Wilson; Joe Thomas

"The Last Song" is a song written by Brian Wilson and Joe Thomas and is the closing track of No Pier Pressure, Wilson's final studio album of new material. The song was originally planned to feature Lana Del Rey, though she eventually backed out, leaving Wilson to perform the song solo.

The song received critical acclaim from critics, who praised its "elegiac" melody and harmonies and generally considered it Wilson's best song on the album.

== Composition ==
"The Last Song" was written to be the centerpiece of No Pier Pressure. Co-producer Joe Thomas recounted that the song was originally about love that was lost, "[b]ut after the tour fell apart it became more about a missed opportunity for Brian and [the other Beach Boys] to ride into the sunset together."

== Critical reception ==
Michael Hann of The Guardian considered "The Last Song" as the best song on No Pier Pressure, stating that it "sounds like Wilson is reflecting on his former group, and acknowledging that his career is at an end... over a wonderful arrangement and a desperately sad melody." Will Hermes of Rolling Stone magazine deemed the song as the album's "old-school pinnacle", with "Wilson’s voice, alone and shipwrecked, [rising] above a bed of piano and strings, ghostly harmony vocals flickering around him". Stacey Anderson of Pitchfork Media felt it was fortunate that Lana Del Rey dropped out from the song, as "[i]t’s the autonomous note Wilson deserves to end on, a lovely, bittersweet swath of the elegiac strings and gilded harmonies he perfected in his youth."

Neil McCormick of The Telegraph assessed that though the album's other songs were not able to reach the quality of Wilson's great compositions from the past, "the gorgeous, elegiac album closer The Last Song is a reminder that Wilson set the bar particularly high." McCormick added that "If this really is the Last Song, the Beach Boy can bow out with head held high."

== Personnel ==
- Brian Wilson - lead vocals
- Don Was - bass guitar
