= Melinda Ledbetter =

American talent manager (1946–2024)

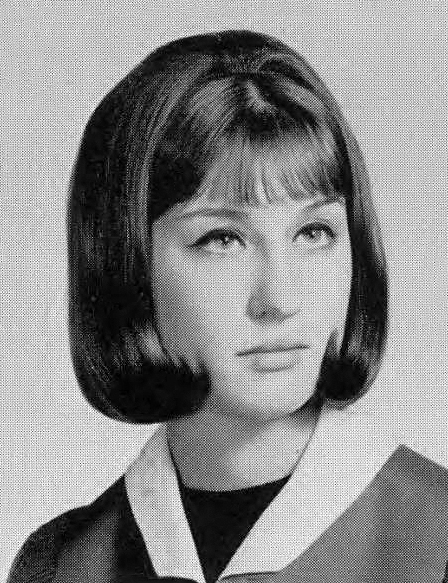
- Ledbetter in 1964
- Born: Melinda Kae Ledbetter; October 3, 1946; Pueblo, Colorado, U.S.
- Died: January 30, 2024 (aged 77); Beverly Hills, California, U.S.
- Other names: Melinda Wilson
- Occupations: Manager and conservator of Brian Wilson
- Years active: 1990s–2024
- Organization: BriMel Music
- Spouse: Brian Wilson (m. 1995)
- Children: 5

Melinda Kae Ledbetter (October 3, 1946 – January 30, 2024) was an American talent manager who was the second wife and longtime manager of Brian Wilson of the Beach Boys. Before her marriage, she worked as a model and car saleswoman. Ledbetter was credited with helping to initiate Wilson's court-ordered separation from his former psychologist, Eugene Landy, and leading Wilson to proper medical care. Her account of her early relationship with Wilson was dramatized for the 2014 biopic Love & Mercy, in which Ledbetter is portrayed by Elizabeth Banks.

== Background ==
Ledbetter was born in Pueblo, Colorado, on October 3, 1946, to Rosemary and Leonard Ledbetter, an Air Force pilot who had been stationed there. Melinda grew up in Whittier, California, and was of German and Irish descent. She had a 16-year career as a commercial model for designers including Bob Mackie and Anne Klein, after which she became a sales representative for a Cadillac dealership in Los Angeles.

In 1986, while working at the car dealership, Ledbetter met Brian Wilson. At the time, Wilson had been a patient under Eugene Landy's 24-hour therapy program. Six months after meeting Wilson, she had reported Landy to the state's attorney general for ethical violations, but they informed her that nothing could be done without the cooperation of Wilson's family. According to Ledbetter, Landy ordered Wilson to sever ties with her in 1989, "when we [Brian and I] started to get serious".

== Marriage to Brian Wilson ==
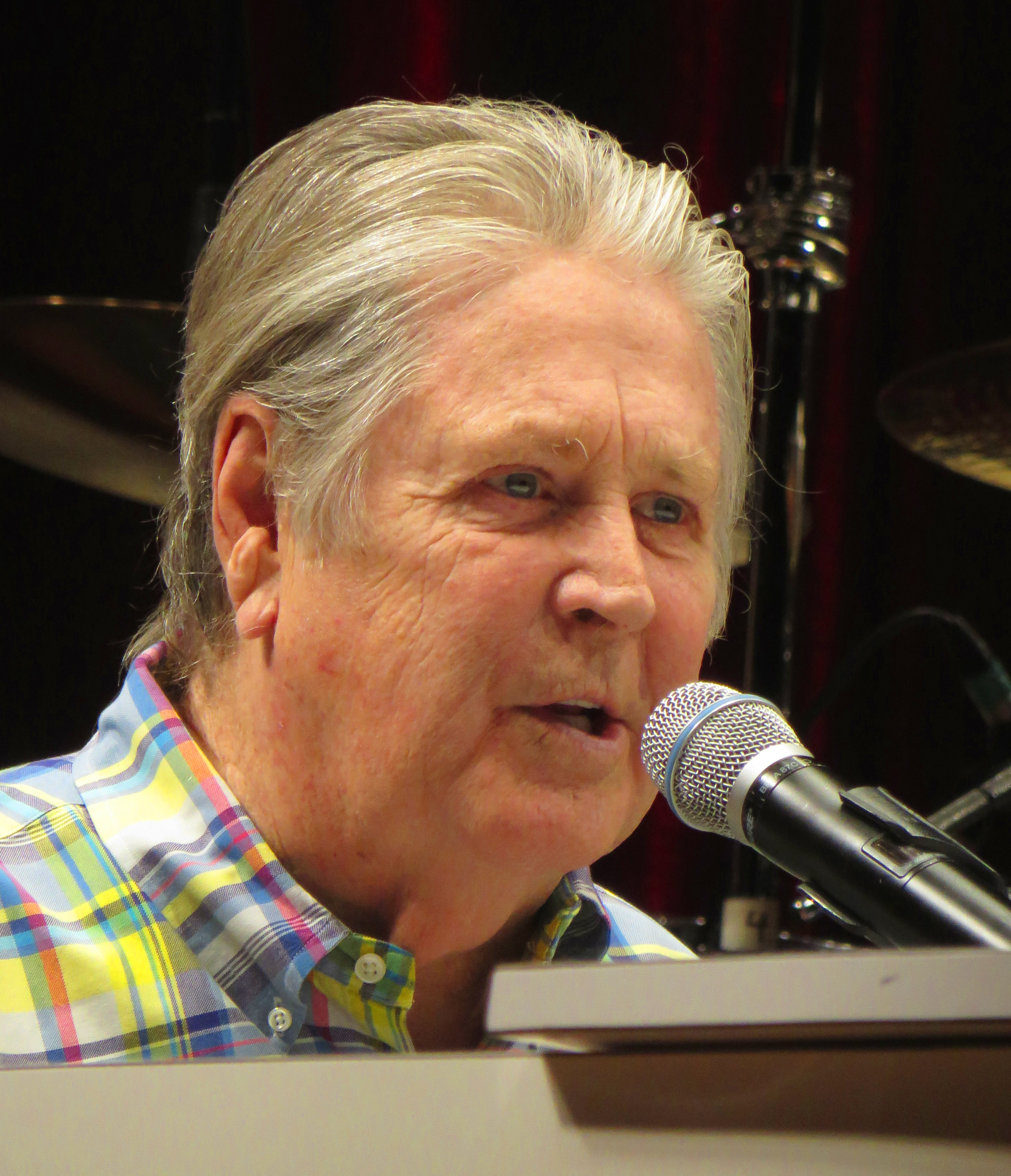
Brian Wilson performing in 2015

After Landy was struck with a 1991 court order which barred him from contacting Wilson, Wilson and Ledbetter reconnected and were married on February 6, 1995. Ledbetter went on to become Wilson's manager in 1999, a job which she said was "basically negotiating, and that's what I did every single day when I sold cars." According to Ledbetter, "I was in the right place at the right time to help him. It's like the concept that you can lead a horse to water but you can't get him to drink. ... What he's missed out on is an environment where he feels safe. He didn't have that before with his family, his old band, his doctor, his first wife. But he finally has that."

Ledbetter was credited with leading Wilson to proper medical care, to tour regularly, and to complete his unfinished album Smile. However, numerous reports surrounding Wilson's comeback alleged that his close associates, including Ledbetter, had been exploiting Wilson and applying undue pressure on him to maintain an active music career. In 1998, Wilson's daughter Carnie called her "Melandy", a reference to Landy and the control he formerly held over Wilson's affairs. In a 2007 interview, Wilson credited his relationship with Ledbetter for allowing him to resume his career as a musician. However, in the same interview, he remarked that he felt that he should have spent the early 2000s "in a mental institution under heavy sedation" due to his psychological issues. Whether Wilson truly consented to his semi-regular touring schedule since the 2000s remains a subject of debate among fans.

In the mid-1990s, Wilson collaborated with multi-instrumentalist Andy Paley on tracks earmarked for a potential Beach Boys comeback album. It was reported that Ledbetter influenced Wilson to scrap the project in favor of a new album with Joe Thomas. In 1999, a suit was filed against Thomas, seeking damages and a declaration which freed Wilson to work on his next album without involvement from Thomas. Thomas reciprocated with a suit citing that Ledbetter "schemed against and manipulated" him and Wilson. The case was settled out of court.

According to Wilson's cousin and former bandmate Mike Love, the group's 50th anniversary reunion tour involving all original surviving members ended prematurely, partly due to interference from Ledbetter. Love expressed disappointment that he was never allowed to collaborate with Wilson for the album That's Why God Made the Radio, as had been promised, and that during the performances, she attempted to install an autotune unit on each of the band members' microphones. This was the beginning of some backstage quarrels between Love and Ledbetter, which ended with his stipulating that she be banned from rehearsals until the tour was over.

In 2015, Wilson credited Ledbetter with assisting with some of the production of his album No Pier Pressure. Upon Ledbetter's death in 2024, Wilson wrote that "She was my savior. She gave me the emotional security I needed to have a career. She encouraged me to make the music that was closest to my heart. She was my anchor.”

== Love & Mercy ==
Half of the 2014 Brian Wilson biographical film Love & Mercy is set from Ledbetter's point of view in the 1980s, with Elizabeth Banks playing Ledbetter. Love & Mercy screenwriter Oren Moverman stated that virtually every event in the film's 1980s portions was sourced from conversations he had with Ledbetter. She said after watching the film: "I remembered that what Landy did to Brian was even worse. You don't get a sense of it in the movie, but it happened on a daily basis, for years."

== Personal life and death ==
Ledbetter and Wilson adopted five children.

Ledbetter died at her home in Beverly Hills, California, on January 30, 2024, at the age of 77. Her death was announced by Wilson via his Twitter account.
