= One Kind of Love =

Song by Brian Wilson

from the album No Pier Pressure
- Released: April 7, 2015
- Length: 3:34
- Label: Capitol
- Songwriters: Brian Wilson, Scott Bennett
- Producers: Brian Wilson, Joe Thomas

Music video
- "One Kind of Love" on YouTube

"One Kind of Love" is a song written by Brian Wilson and Scott Bennett, released as the eleventh track on Wilson's eleventh studio album No Pier Pressure on April 7, 2015. A music video debuted online two months later in June. It is one of the few songs on the album which does not give a writing credit to Joe Thomas.

The song was written for Bill Pohlad's film Love & Mercy and appears on its accompanying soundtrack.

== Critical reception ==
The Telegraph drew comparisons between it and the french horn in "God Only Knows". In a review that called No Pier Pressure "inessential listening", the New York Observer wrote that "One Kind of Love" was evidence that "Wilson can still throw one hell of a melody out there."

== Accolades ==
Year	Organization	Accolade	Result	Ref
2015	Nashville Film Festival	Best Original Song	Won	
2016	Golden Globe Awards	Best Original Song	Nominated	
2016	Satellite Awards	Best Original Song	Nominated	
2016	21st Critics' Choice Awards	Best Song	Nominated	
