= Love & Mercy (film) =

2014 film by Bill Pohlad

- Theatrical release poster
- Directed by: Bill Pohlad
- Written by: Oren Moverman; Michael Alan Lerner
- Produced by: Bill Pohlad; Claire Rudnick Polstein; John Wells
- Starring: John Cusack; Paul Dano; Elizabeth Banks; Paul Giamatti
- Cinematography: Robert Yeoman
- Edited by: Dino Jonsäter
- Music by: Atticus Ross
- Production companies: Battle Mountain Films; River Road Entertainment
- Distributed by: Lionsgate; Roadside Attractions
- Release dates: September 7, 2014 (TIFF); June 5, 2015 (United States)
- Running time: 121 minutes
- Country: United States
- Language: English
- Budget: $10 million
- Box office: $28.6 million

Love & Mercy is a 2014 American biographical drama film directed by Bill Pohlad about the Beach Boys' co-founder and leader Brian Wilson and his struggles with mental illness during the 1960s and 1980s. It stars Paul Dano and John Cusack as the young and older Wilson, respectively, with Elizabeth Banks as his second wife Melinda Ledbetter and Paul Giamatti as his psychologist Dr. Eugene Landy. The title comes from Wilson's 1988 song of the same name.

The film alternates between Wilson's production of the album Pet Sounds (1966) and his treatment under Landy's 24-hour therapy program in the late 1980s. Wilson called the film "very factual", despite containing parts that "weren't actually as factual". He had little involvement with its making, although Ledbetter was relied upon for the 1980s portions. The cast and crew maintained that nothing in the film was a "Hollywood" embellishment and that everything was intended to be as truthful as possible. Conversely, Landy's son Evan felt that his father was unfairly portrayed. Some minor inaccuracies were noted by critics, a number of which relate to the minimal coverage devoted to Wilson's family and collaborators. Ledbetter said that Landy's treatment of Wilson "was even worse" than the film portrays.

Love & Mercy premiered at the 2014 Toronto International Film Festival on September 7, 2014 and was released by Lionsgate and Roadside Attractions on June 5, 2015. It grossed $28.6 million over a $10 million budget and received positive reviews from critics, with Dano's performance garnering significant praise. It was nominated for two Golden Globes: Best Supporting Actor – Motion Picture (Paul Dano) and Best Original Song ("One Kind of Love"). A soundtrack album that includes the original score by Atticus Ross was released on August 14, 2015.

== Plot ==
The film alternates between the 1960s and the 1980s. The early timeline begins with a young Brian Wilson suffering a panic attack on an airplane. After recovering, Brian convinces his brothers Carl and Dennis to let him quit touring with the Beach Boys and instead focus on composition and studio work. Despite his father and his cousin Mike Love's criticisms regarding the lyrics and production, Brian completes the Pet Sounds album. It is a critical hit, but sales are underwhelming. LSD is supplied to Wilson by a coterie of hippies who praise him as a "genius", and his mental health subsequently worsens, beginning to hallucinate voices. After the success of a new single, "Good Vibrations", he fails to complete the album Smile, his would-be masterpiece. As Wilson's bandmates are left to finish a simplified version of the album, now titled Smiley Smile, he learns that his father has sold the publishing rights to the Beach Boys' songs without their permission. This timeline ends with Wilson apathetic and detached from life.

In the 1980s, an older and heavily medicated Brian Wilson meets Melinda Ledbetter, a Cadillac saleswoman. She begins a relationship with him, but is disturbed by the controlling influence Wilson's therapist and legal guardian Dr. Eugene Landy has over Wilson's life. Eventually, she disengages from the relationship, but not before, with help from Wilson's housekeeper Gloria Ramos, providing evidence to Wilson's family that Landy has been made a beneficiary in his will. This leads to a restraining order being taken out to prevent Landy from seeing Wilson, who begins a new and more appropriate course of treatment. A few years later, Wilson bumps into Ledbetter again while walking across an intersection. They eventually marry, and Wilson completes Smile as his own solo album.

== Cast ==
- John Cusack as Brian Wilson–Future (Note: "Brian–Future" and "Brian–Past" are how these roles are officially credited.)
  - Paul Dano as Brian Wilson–Past
  - Oliver Pohlad as Young Brian
- Elizabeth Banks as Melinda Ledbetter
- Paul Giamatti as Dr. Eugene Landy
- Jake Abel as Mike Love
- Kenny Wormald as Dennis Wilson
- Brett Davern as Carl Wilson
- Graham Rogers as Al Jardine
- Erin Darke as Marilyn Wilson
- Bill Camp as Murry Wilson
- Joanna Going as Audree Wilson
- Nick Gehlfuss as Bruce Johnston
- Mark Linett as Chuck Britz
- Johnny Sneed as Hal Blaine
- Gary Griffin as Al De Lory
- Teresa Cowles as Carol Kaye
- Vince Meghrouni as Woodwind/Brass Player
- Jeff Meacham as Tony Asher
- Max Schneider as Van Dyke Parks
- Diana Maria Riva as Gloria
- Erik Eidem as Doug
- Dylan Kenin as Rob
- Carolyn Stotesbery as Sarah
- Fred Cross as Cadillac Colleague
- Tyson Ritter as Hipster #1
- Jeff Galfer as Hipster #2
- Morgan Phillips as Evan Landy
- Wayne Basturp as Process Server
- Jonathan Slavin as Phil Spector

== Production ==
=== Pre-production ===
I have no interest in making a biopic. ... What's fascinating to me is to look at the different elements in his life, like that super-creative period when he was doing Pet Sounds and the later part when he was redeemed. ... You don't have to know the music here in the same way you didn't have to know the math in Beautiful Mind ... What we want to do is let you experience the story in a personal way.

— Bill Pohlad, June 2011

A theatrical film adaptation of Wilson's life, titled Love and Mercy, was first proposed in 1988, and was planned to star William Hurt as Wilson and Richard Dreyfuss as Landy. It derived its title from Wilson's single, "Love and Mercy" (1988), which appeared as the opening track to his debut solo album Brian Wilson. While the project stagnated in development hell, the Beach Boys were eventually featured as the subject of two made-for-TV dramatizations: Summer Dreams: The Story of the Beach Boys (1990) which was widely derided for their historical inaccuracies and The Beach Boys: An American Family (2000) which Brian Wilson harshly criticized. (Note: Pohlad said he did not want to be "affected" by other films, and purposely avoided watching Summer Dreams and An American Family.) Rolling Stone reported in 1999 that Melinda hoped to organize a Wilson biopic which starred Jeff Bridges.

In 2006, the Wilson biopic project was briefly revived, and was to have included involvement from producers Mark Gordon, Lawrence Inglee, Jordan Wynn, and David Leaf. Nothing further was reported. As film producer/director Bill Pohlad cultivated an obsession with the 1997 box set The Pet Sounds Sessions, he became interested in Brian Wilson's life while eventual producers John Wells and Claire Rudnick Polstein were attempting to make a Beach Boys film. Love & Mercy is the second feature directed by Pohlad—decades from his previous—and was financed with his own money. After the film was formally announced on June 23, 2011, information about it remained relatively scarce until its unveiling in September 2014.

=== Writing ===
Pohlad deemed the original script he received (titled Heroes and Villains, after the Beach Boys' song) unsatisfactory, and so he enlisted writer-director Oren Moverman, who had previously found success with the impressionistic Bob Dylan biopic I'm Not There (2007), which Pohlad believed was "an admirable effort ... [but] went too far". Pohlad claimed that Love & Mercy drew significant interest from "pretty big people in all parts of the business ... But a lot of them honestly were such Beach Boys fans that they almost were too close to it. They couldn't see the forest for the trees." Originally, Pohlad intended to produce and have Moverman direct. When Moverman found that Pohlad had a clear vision for the film to be, he suggested that Pohlad direct the movie instead.

Rather than having a conventional story, in June 2011 the biopic was reported to focus on specific elements of Wilson's life. At this stage, Pohlad contemplated focusing on three eras of Wilson's life instead of two: "It was Brian past, which was the 1960s Brian. Brian present, which was the guy in bed. And Brian future, which became the John Cusack era. And kind of by interweaving those we'd show, without having to tell every beat." Philip Seymour Hoffman was considered for the projected "Brian–Present" role. When Moverman was asked about his nontraditional approach to musician's stories, he answered:

You can be more adventurous with film structure because musicians create structures and personas and characters, because they're performers. ... You're not just trying to tell a story, you're also trying to create a cinematic equivalent of what the man's music was about. Same thing with Brian. You listen to the music, you realize what was adventurous and experimental about what he was doing, and then you ask yourself, How do we tell his story in that way, too? Can we create strange chord shifts in the cinematic structure of this movie? Can we move between things that are not supposed to work together and make them work in harmony somehow?

In November 2011, Wilson stated that he didn't know when the film would be done, and he was currently "trying to get the script so it's accurate". Though Wilson was consulted on the film, Ledbetter was deeply involved in communications. Wilson later clarified: "I had no control or involvement in the film, but my wife did. She made sure they cast the characters right, you know so they could capture my personality and the records and stuff like that." It was reported that Wilson offered some editing notes after attending a table read and after watching a rough cut of the film by himself. Pohlad explained the purpose of the table read: "[It was] to make sure he would understand what we were doing. He sat there and I wasn't sure if we lost him or if he was still with us. But later, he called with some insightful notes. Not a lot of notes, like three or four, but really insightful comments." Pohlad added during a Q&A: "They [Ledbetter and Wilson] were never all over us about it – 'Don't do that,' or 'I'm funnier than that' ... [His notes] were all very directed to – they weren't like ego things, they were more like how the process worked ... just keeping us on track versus 'make me look better' or something like that." Wilson's veteran collaborator Van Dyke Parks – portrayed by Max Schneider – stated that he had no involvement in the film, and awaited its historical accuracy in what he called "Mrs. Wilson's biopic". On February 8, 2012, Moverman announced that the script was complete.

=== Casting ===
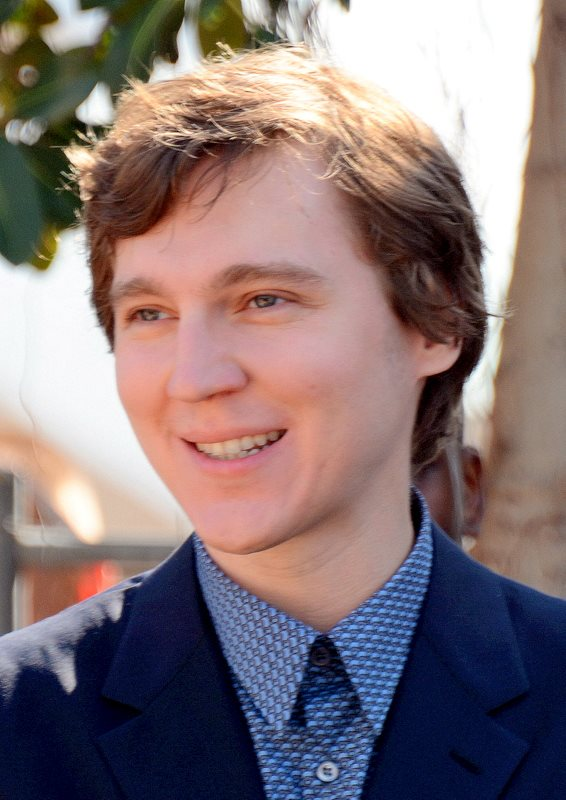
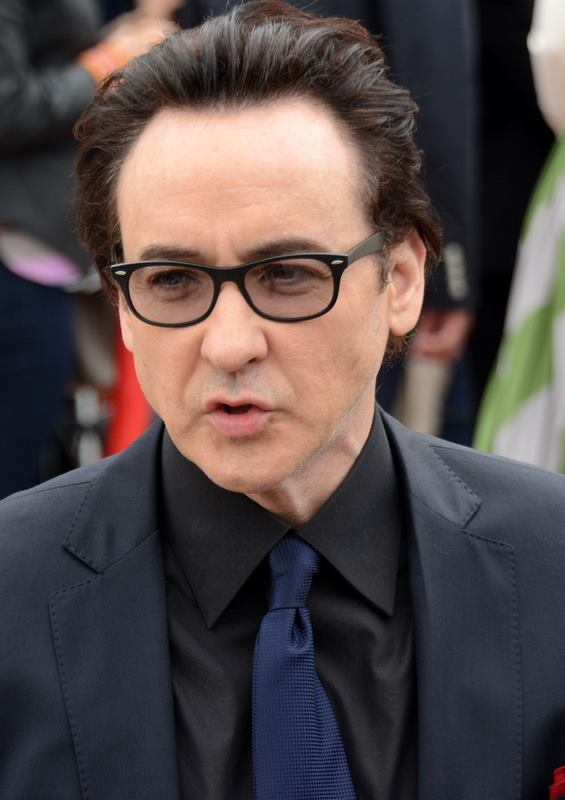
Paul Dano and John Cusack portray Wilson at different stages of life.

Paul Dano was cast as the young Wilson and believed, "I don't think it's a totally traditional biopic. I think it's gonna be a fun and accessible film, and I think it's hopefully going to be interesting, like the man that it's depicting. I think he [Moverman] did an amazing job cracking this story, and I can't imagine anyone else having done it, aside from him. I know they tried to make movies about Brian for a long time, and I think music stories are tough to tell in an interesting way." When asked how familiar he was with Wilson before getting involved, Dano answered that he knew the Beach Boys' music, but was not aware of the extent of Wilson's troubles. He proceeded to immerse himself in Wilson's life by reading, listening, and watching as much information pertinent to Wilson as he could, purposefully abstaining from meeting him in person until he was sure he had absorbed everything in full.

Dano reportedly prepared for the role by "filling up" on Wilson's Pet Sounds while learning how to play piano. He explained, "Without question, learning to play and sing and listening to the music was the most important, because the most true Brian to me is in Pet Sounds. If you want to know him, you go listen to it." He related to Wilson's character adding, "Some of it is frankly deeply personal. Brian talked about trying to make music that would heal people. Knowing that his life was so hard and that was his attitude I felt like that's somebody I want to spend time with. Whether I needed love and mercy at the time or I wanted to give it I'm not sure." Of his musical performances, he recalls, "There are a few scenes where you hear me start a line of a song and by the end of the session, you're hearing Brian's vocals. I have to give credit to the sound people, the transitions are really smooth; you can't tell that one half of it is the real thing and one half is me faking it, so I thank those guys a lot." Dano also prepared for the role by gaining weight.

John Cusack, who plays Dano's older counterpart, was chosen for the role after Pohlad watched Don Was' biographical film I Just Wasn't Made for These Times (1995). Pohlad found portraying the 1980s Wilson to be difficult, since he believed Wilson's appearance changed rapidly in that era, but Cusack immediately popped into his head after watching the biography. Pohlad admitted: "He hasn't necessarily always either gotten or taken the greatest roles, but I thought this one would be a good one that would really allow him to shine, and he's truly delivered on that. A lot of people still come up and say, 'Oh, that Paul Dano looks exactly like Brian, but why'd you pick John Cusack? He doesn't look at all like Brian.' Actually, he does, if you look back at that one era." After being selected, Cusack listened to the 2011 release of The Smile Sessions, enthusing, "You get a portrait of the genius at work at the apex of his powers at the time before he kind of went into the ashes," and, "It's hard to overestimate his influence on music. Pet Sounds was a year before Sergeant Pepper's Lonely Hearts, and everything you hear in the Beatles is there. And then you listen more. Especially to The Smile Sessions, and you hear all these other connections. Boom, there's ELO, there's another band." Cusack later recommended I Just Wasn't Made for These Times as a "companion piece" to Love & Mercy. The decision to have two actors play Wilson was somewhat based on the notion that Wilson today is perceived as a completely different person from when he was in his 20s. Dano believes: "It's important to see the juxtaposition of the two people, especially when you see Brian in the studio so vital, and then see the older Brian quiet, almost traumatized. There is a mystery there, how did that person become that?" Cusack elaborated on his experience with meeting Wilson: "When Brian would talk about the younger version of himself, he was completely dispassionate, like it was someone other than him—in a more extreme way than other people look back on when they were 21. Seeing him talking about it, he just had no ownership of himself." Pohlad encouraged Cusack and Dano not to work together and conjure an impression of Wilson between themselves, and instead try to get an independent sense of who Wilson is from the inside.

Paul Giamatti said of the film, "I play Dr. Landy, the crazy psychotherapist. It's a great character. Brian Wilson had a severe freakout and his family got in touch with a psychotherapist out in L.A. named Eugene Landy who took over. That's where most of the story comes from, because the doctor was basically insane. He made Brian play in a sandbox, I mean crazy stuff." (Note: Giamatti may have been referring to Wilson's 1976 guest appearance on Saturday Night Live in which he performed a solo piano rendition of "Good Vibrations" while stationed in a sandbox, which was in itself a nod to lore pertaining to the Smile sessions.) Giamatti prepared for the role by engrossing himself in contemporary articles, meeting the real life Landy's early career acquaintances, and listening to hours of tapes wherein Giamatti says "he'd just keep talking and talking, in these completely huge paragraphs. They were brilliant-sounding, but if you dug into them they didn't make much sense."

=== Filming ===
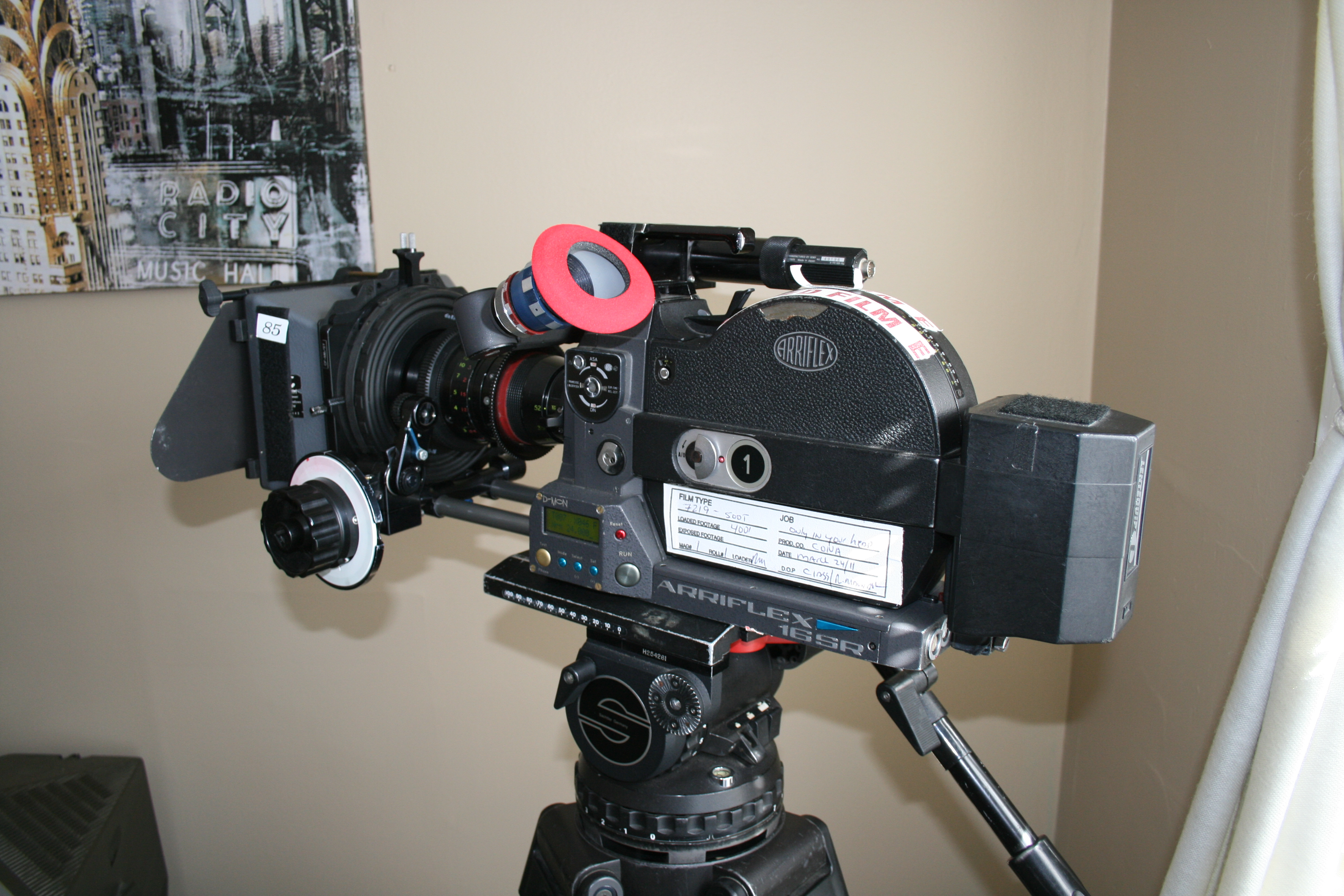
16 mm film shot by an Arri 16SR3 camera was used to give the movie's 1960s setting a period-authentic feel

Looking for a seasoned director of photography, Pohlad sought cinematographer Robert Yeoman, who is best known for his credits on Wes Anderson films. Yeoman recalled: "I loved the script and the take on the story. Bill had a lot of great ideas and I felt it would be an amazing film to be part of." He strongly felt that the film should not be shot in Louisiana for tax incentives, and also resisted digital capture, explaining: "The story takes place in an analog time, so I felt we needed the grain and texture of film to give [the settings] a realistic feel." Every scene set in 1960s recording studios was shot in Super 16, as well as a few other select scenes. In contrast to Pohlad's desire for the decade to look warm and romantic, the 1980s scenes were given a cold white and blue cast.

The film's studio depictions strove to recapture Wilson's elaborate recording processes during the sessions for Beach Boys albums Pet Sounds and the unfinished Smile. To this end, the scenes were shot "documentary style," and real musicians were hired to act as the session musicians Wilson used. They were also filmed in the actual studios where the Beach Boys' music was recorded in the 1960s, such as the Studio 3-room at EastWest Studios, which was then known as United Western Recorders. Pohlad claimed that they were real sessions with direction largely improvised by Dano, who instructed the musicians based on his impression of Wilson's tone and the way that he worked: "We had two Super 16 handheld cameras going, and for most of that we were just able to grab shots as we would if we were shooting a documentary." About the musicians, he added: "We didn't really rehearse with them, or tell them much what we were doing. They brought their instruments, and we dressed them in period clothing, and we basically sat them down like they were there for a session." Yeoman was "purposely kept out of the rehearsals, so he never really knew what was coming—he just had to get it," Pohlad says. Fly on the wall documentary films such as Sympathy for the Devil (1968) and Let It Be (1970) were used as references.

Principal photography began on July 15, 2013, in the Hollywood area and expanded to various locations around Southern California. Shooting lasted for 35 days. Wilson announced the film's wrapping through his Twitter page by posting a photo of himself and his wife along with Cusack. The film's wrap party featured a special appearance by Wilson, who performed a solo live set. In January 2014, Pohlad reported that he was currently editing the film in New York. In July, a casting call was made for additional filming requiring a depiction of 1980s period cars.

=== Soundtrack ===
I was nervous about a couple of different things. ... I felt that music films generally have reached such a level of utter (garbage). So I put off reading (the script), assuming those things, but then I did read it and I thought it was a brilliant script.

— Atticus Ross, May 2015

English composer Atticus Ross was commissioned for an original score. Ross, who is selective about the films he works on, says he agreed to Love & Mercy because "I liked him [Pohlad] from the moment of meeting him. He's a guy with vision and that's what, as a musician, you need from the director. His company was built on making the kind of films that I would love to be working on." Inspiration for the score came from the Beatles' "Revolution 9" (1968) and the Beatles/Jay-Z mashup album The Grey Album (2004). Variety observed that Ross's score "reincorporates snatches of the Beach Boys' effervescent melodies into something that sounds intriguingly similar to Animal Collective.

Pohlad commented on the film's use of original Beach Boys multitrack session tapes, "[S]o much of what developed out of it was based on the ability to get into tracks. From a music perspective, certainly, the ability of Atticus and I to get into the tracks and play with them was important. Also to have the music in the film was important. It was not ever going to be a Mamma Mia! kind of movie. We didn't want that." (Note: In 2010, John Stamos announced that he was to co-produce a non-biographical film of the Beach Boys modeled after the musical film Mamma Mia! (2008).) In June 2014, touring Beach Boy co-founder Mike Love reported that Wilson had been in the studio recording music which would be used in the film.

On September 19, 2014, Pohlad announced that the film's soundtrack would be released by Capitol Records sometime in the future, later reported for release in 2015. On June 2, 2015, Pohlad reported that there were complications but that the soundtrack should be released shortly after the film. On August 13, the digital global release date was announced for the following day.

== Historical accuracy ==
Slate magazine wrote in its analysis of the film's fact and fiction: "While Love & Mercy makes some perhaps necessary adjustments to simplify the musician's story, the film is generally quite meticulous in its presentation of the events of Wilson's life." Vulture "fact-checked" the film and found that it has "whopping gaps [but] few of them matter." Consequence of Sound reported that the film recreates "several iconic portraits and moments", including the photo shoot of the band's Surfin' Safari (1962) to the performance of the live album Beach Boys Concert (1964): "These are all handled with the utmost accuracy, seemingly down to the lines in the sand, and that acute attention to detail carries over into just about every other facet of the film." Audio engineer Mark Linett, who has a longstanding association with Wilson, was employed as a technical consultant. He also plays the role of Chuck Britz, the engineer who often worked with Wilson during the 1960s. Keyboardist Darian Sahanaja, who plays in Wilson's touring band, was the supervising musical consultant who helped coordinate the film's musical segments. He also served as Dano's music coach.

There are so many things that went on in his life that were like, you've got to be kidding. ... Nobody's ever going to believe that, but with a lot of things in the movie, we didn't want to back away from it or create something that was false. ... So we tried to make it as genuine as we could and to be straightforward about it and not back away.

— Bill Pohlad, June 2015

Real footage of Wilson appears in the film because of Pohlad's concern that audiences wouldn't believe Wilson actually acts like how he is portrayed in the movie. In Giamatti's view: "The problem was that no one is going to believe a lot of this was for real. It's so much more bizarre than you could actually show." Some events in Wilson's life were, in Pohlad's words, "something that seems like a screenwriter made up just to take the easy way out," though he maintains that no "Hollywood touch" was added to the story. While there was an expectation among the cast and crew that audiences would find elements of the film too outlandish or grandstanding, the decision was made to keep everything as factual as possible.

In order to write the script, Moverman consulted a wealth of books and articles in addition to speaking to people who knew Wilson in the 1960s and 1980s. He felt that Landy was the most difficult character to write for, as he says: "even though many things that he [Landy] says in the movie I actually have recording of, in real life he was a cartoon and in real life he was so over the top." Moverman has maintained that everything in the 1980s portions actually happened based on conversations he had had with Ledbetter, with a few exceptions being some topics of conversation spoken by the character Wilson in the film – they derived from Moverman's research but were unknown to have happened in real life.

Slate pointed out that, contrary to what is depicted in the film, Landy did not accompany Wilson and Ledbetter on their first date. Instead, his assistants did, though Landy checked in by phone numerous times. In the 2006 biography Catch a Wave, Peter Ames Carlin credited Beach Boys fan Peter Reum and biographer David Leaf for bringing Brian's condition to the attention of Carl Wilson, whereas the film depicts Ledbetter contacting Carl by phone. Slate adds that Ledbetter is aided in the film by Wilson's housekeeper, Gloria Ramos, who – along with Leaf – is given special thanks in the liner notes to several of Wilson's albums. The Weeklings observed that Carl is "barely an entity" in the film despite having had a major role in getting rid of Landy. Other notable real life people who appear in the film – but are given markedly reduced significance – include Wilson's family in the 1960s and Smile collaborator Van Dyke Parks.

== Release ==
In July 2014, a premiere screening was announced in the Special Presentations section of the September 2014 Toronto International Film Festival. It was shown on September 7, 8 and 11. Wilson was in attendance at the first screening. Ioncinema ranked Love & Mercy #153 in its list of "Top 200 Most Anticipated Films for 2014" and wrote: "you can be sure that programmers from Cannes to Toronto have already found time to grab a first look. This will receive a red carpet showing wherever it premieres and should at that point be picked up for distribution." The Huffington Post speculated the film to be one of eighteen most-talked-about at the 2014 Toronto Film Festival. The Hollywood Reporter revealed that it was in the festival's top 15 in ticket sales.

North American rights were purchased by Lionsgate and Roadside Attractions for $3 million. For its premiere in Europe, the film was screened in the Berlinale Special Galas section of the 65th Berlin International Film Festival. Wilson also attended this screening. Its American premier was at the South by Southwest (SXSW) film festival in March 2015.

Roadside Attractions distributed the film to North American theaters on June 5, 2015. In other countries, the film was released by Lions Gate Entertainment. A teaser trailer for the film was released in February 2015, with an extended trailer following in April. Co-president of Roadside Attractions Howard Cohen said that it refrained from "rushing" the film for the 2014 awards season: "Pretty early on, we said, 'let's put it in June; let's give it space. Let's let it be the movie for its audience when it comes out, as opposed to [being] one of eight.'" On August 25, 2015, the film was made available on digital media and September 15 on physical Blu-ray.

== Reception ==
=== Wilson, Ledbetter, et al. ===
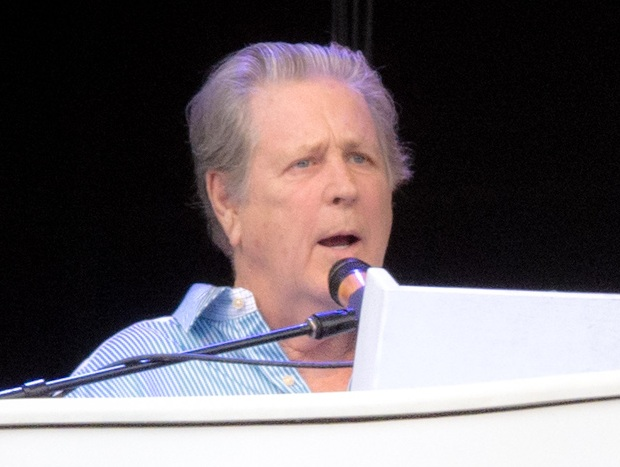
Wilson (pictured in 2012) stated after watching the film: "I thought the actors that portrayed me were well casted ... but they laid pretty heavy on the dark parts of my life, you know? So the movie overall was a bad experience for me to see, but there were good parts."

In October 2013, Wilson enthused, "We've seen some of the film. So far, so good. The guy who plays me, John Cusack, he's really good. And he sings well," and that "It's quite a thrill to have a movie made of my life. ... I'm very sentimental about it, and it's very, very good. It was a trip to see. The actors and actresses portrayed everybody really well." Dano worried that the film's highly personal content would trouble Wilson, but he reported that Wilson loved the film at its premiere screening, saying "he's a little unfiltered, so you would know if he didn't."

Wilson felt that the film was "very factual" (with Dano succeeding at his portrayal better than Cusack) and that each character was cast so well that he "actually believed those characters were really who they were, like the guy who played Doctor Landy was so right on ... that it absolutely scared me. [I was] like absolutely in fear for about ten minutes." On the studio scenes: "[They were] very factual, accurate, stimulating. I was really blown away by how close [Dano] got to my personality. It's amazing." Wilson said that he was "very concerned" but hopeful that the other surviving Beach Boys would enjoy the film. Regarding the trust that Wilson and Ledbetter gave Pohlad for him to construct a true portrait of their lives, Pohlad recounted:

Melinda was the first one to see the first, rougher cut of it, before Brian did. It's as much about her as it is about Brian. I was curious to see what her reaction would be, and she was definitely shaken. ... You think, "Oh, I didn't say that," or "It was better than that" or worse than that. It's a tough thing, so you need some time to let it sink in. I know that Brian believes in many cases in the movie that we were, let's say, fairer to certain people than they actually deserved, maybe. Without getting into details. As harsh as it might be, he thinks that there was some reality that was even harsher than that.

Ledbetter said after watching the film: "I remembered that what Landy did to Brian was even worse. You don't get a sense of it in the movie, but it happened on a daily basis, for years." Al Jardine called the movie "a great biography and pretty darn close to the way I remember it." Landy's son Evan has disputed the film's accuracy, believing that his father was unfairly portrayed.

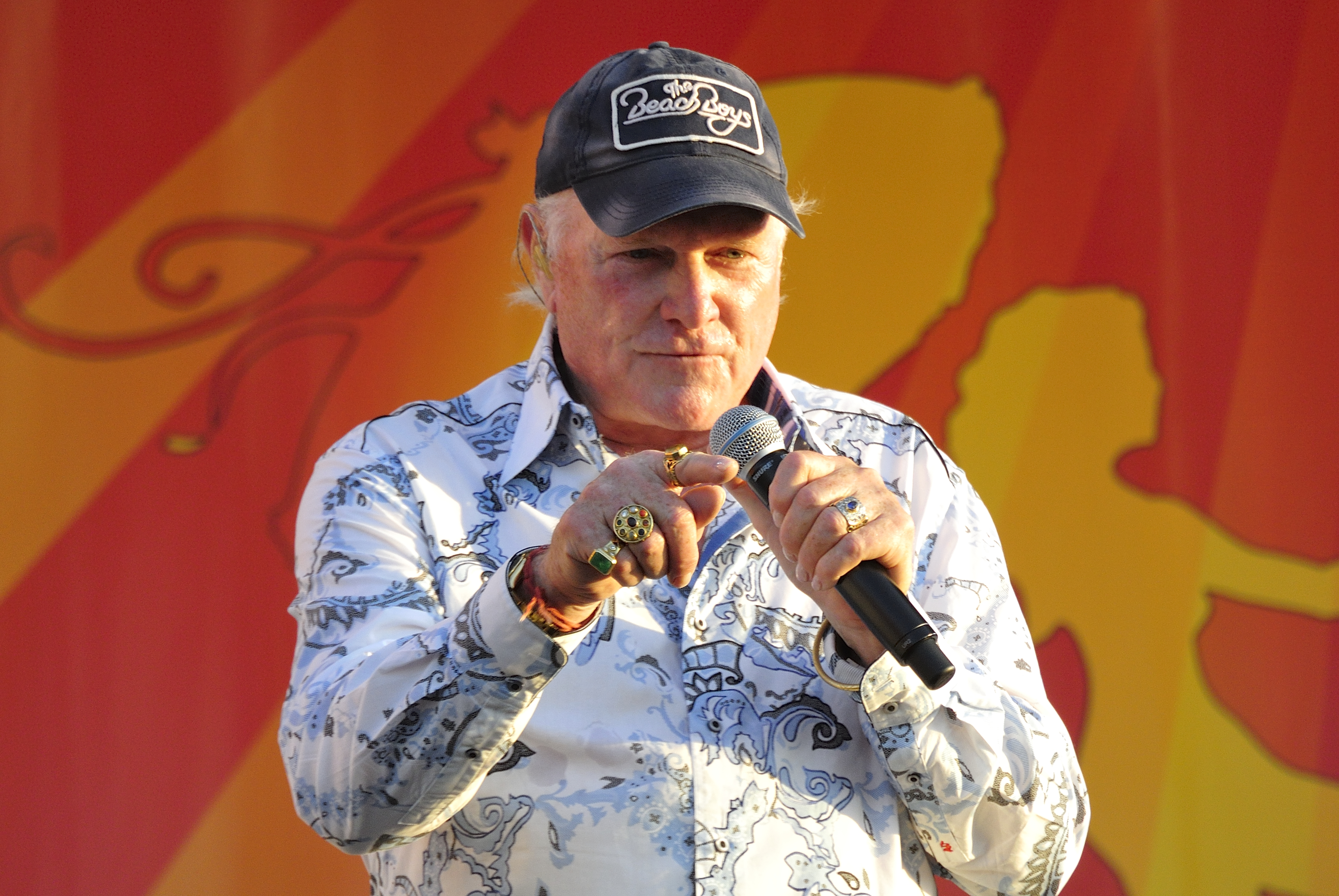
In the February 2016 issue of Rolling Stone, Mike Love said that he was denied an advance screening of the film, adding: "I don't really need to see it. I've lived it."

A few days after the film's wide distribution, Mike Love reported that he was waiting for a chance to see the film before offering his opinion. He also addressed comments by Evan Landy that had been published in the New York Post, calling the article "very interesting because you get an intimate look at someone who was with Brian every day for a few years". Asked if he was aware of inaccuracies in the film, he responded: "That Melinda saved Brian from Dr. Landy. That was my brother Stan Love and Carl [Wilson] who stepped in. Landy was, in fact, over-reaching." He also denied that he was ever verbally cruel to Brian: "Total bull, a fallacy. Brian and I had always been friends." In a late 2016 interview to promote his autobiography, Good Vibrations, he described the film as "a fairy tale" that "should have been done by Disney" and referred to his memoir for further explanation.

Van Dyke Parks, who had not watched the film, expressed disappointment over its alleged omissions and stated: "I've likened the bowed, secco 8th-note cello triplets in 'Good Vibrations' (my idea) to the signature shot of the 'ruby slippers' in The Wizard of Oz. An audio tape in the Capitol Records' archives reveals my voice [at the session] ... And nothing can explain the number of times one hears 'Count it off Van Dyke.'"

=== Box office ===
The film earned $2.1 million during its opening weekend, averaging $4,421 between 480 theaters; eventually expanding to 792 theaters. It went on to gross $12.6 million in the United States and Canada and $16.1 million in other territories for a total gross of $28.6 million.

=== Critical reception ===
On Rotten Tomatoes, the film holds an approval rating of 90% based on 214 reviews, with an average rating of 7.70/10. The website's critical consensus reads, "As unconventional and unwieldy as the life and legacy it honors, Love & Mercy should prove moving for Brian Wilson fans while still satisfying neophytes." On Metacritic, the film has a weighted average score of 80 out of 100, based on 40 critics, indicating "generally favorable" reviews. Audiences polled by CinemaScore gave the film an average grade of "A−" on an A+ to F scale.

The film was well received at the 2014 Toronto Film Festival screening. Audiences rose for a standing ovation, while early reviews unanimously lauded the film. Among many music-related films shown at the Toronto Festival, (Note: Including Roger Waters: The Wall, The Last Five Years, and Eden.) The Wrap deemed Love & Mercy the "boldest" of the crop, while The Washington Post proclaimed that it had "stolen the show," comparing to its other films as "an unexpected, undisputed triumph." The film continued to receive a positive reception at further screenings. (Note: Several reviewers described Love & Mercy as distinctive from typical biopics. Dano, Banks, and Cusack's performances received praise, with some naming Cusack's portrayal one of his best performances to date, and Dano's as Oscar-worthy. Other highlights included the original score by Atticus Ross, cinematography by Robert Yeoman, and the film's depiction of the songwriting/recording process. Many publications awarded the film a perfect score, (Note: Including the San Francisco Chronicle, Chicago Tribune, Washington Post, Tampa Bay Times, Village Voice, BBC, and HitFix.) while reviews speculated that the movie would be a contender for the Academy Awards.)

The film was listed as one of the best movies of 2015 by TIME and by Rolling Stone who also deemed it "one of the best music biopics ever". Consequence of Sound said: "Not since Anton Corbijn's Control, his excellent 2007 retelling of the life and death of Ian Curtis and Joy Division, has a biopic felt so authentic and conditional of its own subject." NPR wrote in an analysis of recent music films: "Love & Mercy makes a fascinating leap by suggesting that the Beach Boys auteur constructed his inimitable soundscapes as a way of dealing with auditory hallucinations – making pop songs that go deep, in part, because they were designed to converse with the voices in his head." The Hollywood Reporter reviewed it favorably, calling it "a deeply satisfying pop biopic whose subject's bifurcated creative life lends itself to an unconventional structure ... [Cusack's] effectiveness [is] limited only by his lack of a physical resemblance to the songwriter. That will be a stumbling block for some fans, but those who can get beyond it will find a very fine film about a singular artist."

The Guardian awarded the film three stars out of five, praising Cusack and Dano's performances, but criticizing the film's "neat" portrayal of Wilson's mental illness and other aspects of his life. IndieWire gave the film a B+ and wrote that, while Landy's character lacked depth, "It's fascinating to watch the songwriter dash frantically around the studio, orchestrating a dozen sounds into auditory unity that only he understands. No matter what else happens in the plot, Love & Mercy excels at placing the music front and center." An additional review by the publication wrote: "[T]he film has plenty of love and mercy for its subject, but also some edginess, in what is a fascinating look at one of popular music's most important and influential songwriters." Maclean's took issue with the film's glorification of Wilson, claiming that it reduced from "biography" into "hagiography", yet maintains "the soundtrack is unimpeachable, and Pohlad offers a riveting look at how Wilson crafted such aural wonders as 'God Only Knows' and 'Good Vibrations'."

The publication Biography felt that the film's source material "inadvertently" reiterates plot devices used by typical biopics, and that, "For better or worse, Brian Wilson is suitably charismatic when he's absolutely bonkers and hearing voices, and relatively boring after he's supposedly cured by a new drug regimen and his wife's benevolence." Grantland was less enthusiastic, writing that the film's characters were treated too graciously in contrast to Giamatti's Landy, in order for the 1980s scenes to remain interesting; however, the treatment assures that "the 1960s sequences work because they use the musician's damaged psyche as a creative spark", something which Dano excelled at during his performance.

=== Awards and accolades ===
List of Accolades
Award / Film Festival	Category	Recipient(s)	Result	Ref(s)
Critics' Choice Movie Awards	Best Supporting Actor	Paul Dano	Nominated	
Critics' Choice Movie Awards	Best Song	Brian Wilson, Scott Bennett ("One Kind of Love")	Nominated	
Golden Globe Awards	Best Supporting Actor – Motion Picture	Paul Dano	Nominated	
Golden Globe Awards	Best Original Song	Brian Wilson, Scott Bennett ("One Kind of Love")	Nominated	
Gotham Independent Film Awards	Best Actor	Paul Dano	Won	
Gotham Independent Film Awards	Best Screenplay	Oren Moverman and Michael Alan Lerner	Nominated	
Independent Spirit Awards	Best Supporting Male	Paul Dano	Nominated	
Nashville Film Festival	Best Original Song	Brian Wilson, Scott Bennett ("One Kind of Love")	Won	
San Diego Film Critics Society Awards	Best Supporting Actor	Paul Dano	Nominated	
San Diego Film Critics Society Awards	Best Use of Music in Film	Atticus Ross	Runner-up	
San Francisco Film Critics Circle Awards	Best Picture		Nominated	
San Francisco Film Critics Circle Awards	Best Actor	Paul Dano	Won	
San Francisco Film Critics Circle Awards	Best Supporting Actor	Paul Dano	Nominated	
San Francisco Film Critics Circle Awards	Best Supporting Actress	Elizabeth Banks	Runner-up	
San Francisco Film Critics Circle Awards	Best Original Screenplay	Michael Alan Lerner and Oren Moverman	Won	
San Francisco Film Critics Circle Awards	Best Editing	Dino Jonsater	Runner-up	
Satellite Awards	Best Supporting Actor – Motion Picture	Paul Dano	Nominated	
Satellite Awards	Best Supporting Actress – Motion Picture	Elizabeth Banks	Nominated	
Satellite Awards	Best Original Screenplay	Michael Alan Lerner and Oren Moverman	Nominated	
Satellite Awards	Best Original Song	Brian Wilson, Scott Bennett ("One Kind of Love")	Nominated	
Washington D.C. Area Film Critics Association Awards	Best Supporting Actor	Paul Dano	Nominated	
