= Essential as Anything =

Compilation album by Mental As Anything
- Released: May 2009
- Recorded: 1979–1995
- Genre: Rock; pop
- Length: 1:17:20
- Label: Warner Australia, Syray Music
- Producer: Mental As Anything; Cameron Allan; Bruce Brown; Russell Dunlop; Elvis Costello; Mark Moffatt, Ricky Fataar; Mark Opitz; Richard Gottehrer; Jeffrey Lesser; Steve James; Charles Fisher

Mental As Anything chronology
Plucked (2005)	Essential as Anything (2009)	Tents Up (2009)

Essential As Anything or Essential As Anything – 30th Anniversary Edition is the fourth compilation album by Australian rock band Mental As Anything, which was released in May 2009 via Warner Music Australia. It celebrates the band's 30th anniversary. Essential As Anything includes tracks from their eight studio albums. It also included a DVD featuring Monumental and Monumental II; two compilations of the band's music videos plus bonus footage and interviews. The album reached number 54 on the ARIA Albums Chart. It was later re-released by Universal Music Australia through Syray Music.

== Track listing ==
Essential As Anything – 30th Anniversary Edition The Hits
No.	Title	Writer(s)	Album	Length
1.	"The Nips Are Getting Bigger"	Martin Plaza	Get Wet, 1979	3:20
2.	"Egypt"	Reg Mombassa	Get Wet, 1979	3:27
3.	"Come Around"	Martin Plaza	Espresso Bongo, 1980	3:03
4.	"(Just Like) Romeo and Juliet"	Bob Hamilton, Freddie Gorman	Non-album single, 1980	2:13
5.	"If You Leave Me, Can I Come Too?"	Martin Plaza	Cats & Dogs, 1981	2:54
6.	"Too Many Times"	Greedy Smith	Cats & Dogs, 1981	2:38
7.	"Berserk Warriors"	Peter O'Doherty	Cats & Dogs, 1981	3:26
8.	"Let's Cook"	Martin Plaza	Cats & Dogs, 1981	3:30
9.	"I Didn't Mean to Be Mean"	Martin Plaza	Non-album single, 1982	3:13
10.	"Close Again"	Peter O'Doherty	Creatures of Leisure, 1983	2:54
11.	"Spirit Got Lost"	Reg Mombassa, Andrew 'Greedy' Smith	Creatures of Leisure, 1983	2:57
12.	"Brain Brain"	Peter O'Doherty	Creatures of Leisure, 1983	4:26
13.	"Working for the Man"	Roy Orbison	Non-album single, 1983	3:22
14.	"Apocalypso"	Martin Plaza, Reg Mombassa	Non-album single, 1984	3:38
15.	"You're So Strong"	Andrew "Greedy" Smith	Fundamental, 1985	3:26
16.	"Live It Up"	Andrew "Greedy" Smith	Fundamental, 1985	3:47
17.	"Date with Destiny"	Andrew "Greedy" Smith	Fundamental, 1985	2:59
18.	"Concrete and Clay" (Martin Plaza solo)	Tommy Moeller, Brian Parker	Single, 1986	2:44
19.	"Let's Go to Paradise"	Andrew 'Greedy' Smith	Mouth to Mouth, 1987	3:10
20.	"He's Just No Good for You"	Andrew 'Greedy' Smith	Mouth to Mouth, 1987	3:25
21.	"Rock and Roll Music"	Chuck Berry	Cyclone Raymond, 1989	3:00
22.	"The World Seems Difficult"	Andrew 'Greedy' Smith	Cyclone Raymond, 1989	3:51
23.	"Mr. Natural"	Martin Plaza	Liar Liar Pants on Fire, 1995	3:58
24.	"Nigel"	Reg Mombassa	Liar Liar Pants on Fire, 1995	2:47
Total length:				1:17:22

Essential As Anything – 30th Anniversary Edition The Videos
No.	Title	Length
1.	"You're so Strong"	3:21
2.	"Romeo and Juliet"	2:11
3.	"If You Leave Me Can I Come Too?"	3:08
4.	"Too Many Times"	2:44
5.	"The Nips Are Getting Bigger"	3:20
6.	"Close Again"	2:48
7.	"Live It Up"	3:22
8.	"Working for the Man"	3:32
9.	"I Didn't Mean to Be Mean"	3:10
10.	"Holiday in Auckland"	1:58
11.	"Egypt"	3:19
12.	"Berserk Warriors"	3:29
13.	"Spirit Got Lost"	2:54
14.	"Ready for You Now"	1:16
15.	"Let's Cook"	2:34
16.	"Got Hit"	3:14
17.	"Wouldn't Try to Explain"	3:28
18.	"Brain Brain"	4:39
19.	"Apocalypso"	3:52
20.	"Come Around"	3:01
21.	"Date with Destiny"	2:58
22.	"Big Wheel"	4:00
23.	"Hold On"	2:59
24.	"Let's Go to Paradise"	3:08
25.	"He's Just no Good for You"	3:32
26.	"Don't Tell Me Now"	3:53
27.	"Love Me Tender"	3:36
28.	"Rock 'n' Roll Music"	3:24
29.	"The World Seems Difficult"	4:04
30.	"Baby You're Wild"	3:17
31.	"Overwhelmed"	3:55
32.	"Mr Natural"	3:56
33.	"Nigel"	2:46
34.	"Whole Wide World"	2:49
35.	"Calling Colin"	3:44
36.	"Just My Luck"	3:08
37.	"The Nips Are Getting Bigger" (live)	3:20
Total length:		2:39:49

== Personnel ==
- Martin Plaza – lead vocals, guitar
- Wayne de Lisle – drums
- Reg Mombassa – guitar, vocals
- Greedy Smith – lead vocals, keyboards, harmonica
- Peter O'Doherty – bass guitar, vocals

== Charts ==
Chart performance for Essential as Anything
Chart (2009)	Peak position
Australian Albums (ARIA)	54
