= Mental As Anything discography =

Band discography

- Studio albums: 13
- EPs: 6
- Compilation albums: 6
- Singles: 41
- Video albums: 3

Mental As Anything were an Australian new wave and pop rock band. They released 13 studio albums, 6 compilations, 6 extended plays and 41 singles.

At the ARIA Music Awards of 2009, they were inducted into the ARIA Hall of Fame.

== Albums ==
=== Studio albums ===
| Title | Album details | Peak chart positions | | | Certifications |
| Title | Album details | AUS | CAN | NZ | Certifications |
|---|---|---|---|---|---|
| Get Wet (aka Mental As Anything) | Released: 1 November 1979; Label: Regular Records (L-37125); Formats: LP, Cassette | 19 | — | — | ARIA: Gold |
| Espresso Bongo | Released: 11 July 1980; Label: Regular Records (L-37356); Formats: LP, Cassette | 37 | — | — | ARIA: Gold |
| Cats & Dogs (aka If You Leave Me, Can I Come Too?) | Released: September 1981; Label: Regular Records (RML 37646); Formats: LP, Cassette | 3 | 44 | 2 | ARIA: Platinum; RIANZ: Gold |
| Creatures of Leisure | Released: March 1983; Label: Regular Records (RRLP 1205); Formats: LP, Cassette | 8 | — | 37 | ARIA: Platinum |
| Fundamental | Released: 1 September 1985; Label: Regular Records (RRLP 1212)); Formats: LP, Cassette, CD | 3 | — | 22 | ARIA: 2× Platinum |
| Mouth to Mouth | Released: 31 July 1987; Label: CBS Records (450361-1); Formats: LP, Cassette, CD | 14 | — | — | ARIA: Gold |
| Cyclone Raymond | Released: 18 September 1989; Label: CBS Records (465645-1); Formats: LP, Cassette, CD | 34 | — | — | |
| Liar Liar Pants on Fire | Released: 14 August 1995; Label: BMG, Festival Records (76896403322); Formats: CD | 32 | — | — | |
| Garàge | Released: 24 August 1998; Label: Festival Records (D93492); Formats: CD | 99 | — | — | |
| Beetroot Stains | Released: 2000; Label: CME, UMA (CMEB0026); Formats: CD | — | — | — | |
| Road Case | Released: November 2002; Label: Barking Mad Records (BM0008); Formats: CD | — | — | — | |
| Plucked | Released: November 2005; Label: Liberation Music (BLUE0812); Formats: CD, download | — | — | — | |
| Tents Up | Released: 15 June 2009; Label: Warner Music Australia (5186546772); Formats: CD, download | — | — | — | |
"—" denotes releases that did not chart or were not released in that territory.

=== Live albums ===
| Title | details |
|---|---|
| At Play | Released: January 2019; Label: Legneds (7738469); Format: CD, Digital, streaming; Note: Recorded in Sydney in October 2018 |

=== Compilation albums ===
| Title | Album details | Peak chart positions | | Certifications |
| Title | Album details | AUS | NZ | Certifications |
|---|---|---|---|---|
| Greatest Hits Volume 1 | Released: April 1986; Label: CBS (SBP 8158); Format: LP, Cassette, CD | 2 | 36 | |
| Chemical Travel | Released: 6 December 1993; Label: Regular Records (D-31094); Format: CD | — | — | |
| Best of | Released: 20 September 1999; Label: Festival Records (D26450); Format: CD | 42 | — | ARIA: Gold |
| Essential As Anything – 30th Anniversary Edition | Released: May 2009; Label: Rhino Records, Warner (5186539165); Format: CD+DVD | 54 | — | |
| Live It Up – The Collection | Released: 11 November 2016 (UK); Label: Music Club Deluxe (MCDLX221); Format: 2×CD | — | — | |
| Surf & Mull & Sex & Fun | Released: 25 October 2019; Label: Universal Music Australia (0801522); Format: 2×LP | — | — | |
"—" denotes releases that did not chart.

== Extended plays ==
| Title | EP details |
|---|---|
| Mental as Anything Plays at Your Party | Released: September 1978; Label: Regular Records (REG1); Format: 7-inch EP; Only 1,200 copies of the EP were produced. |
| Bicycle | Released: January 1995; Label: Independent (MENTAL1); Format: CD; Only 500 copies of the EP were produced and these were given away to fans around the country during the band's 1998 summer tour. All tracks were later included on Liar, Liar, Pants On Fire. |
| Minus Bonus | Released: December 1997; Label: Independent (MAA-2); Format: CD; Only 5,000 copies of the EP were produced. There were given away during the band's 1997/1998 summer tour and at the band's third art exhibition. All tracks were later included on Garage. |
| Borscht | Released: 8 October 2001; Label: CME/Universal(CMEB0027); Format: CD; Essentially a five-track maxi-single of "Stretchmarks", off the album Beetroot Stains. |
| iTunes Live from Sydney | Released: October 2009; Format: digital download |
| 5 Track EP | Released: 12 May 2017; Label: Universal (5764349); Format: CD; 5 Track EP is the actual title on the cover of the release. |

== Singles ==
| Year | Title | Peak chart positions | | | | | | | | | | Album |
| Year | Title | AUS | CAN | IRE | NZ | UK | US Dance | AUT | GER | NOR | SWE | Album |
|---|---|---|---|---|---|---|---|---|---|---|---|---|
| 1979 | "The Nips Are Getting Bigger"^{[A]} | 16 | — | — | — | — | — | — | — | — | — | Get Wet |
| 1979 | "Possible Theme for a Future TV Drama Series" | 57 | — | — | — | — | — | — | — | — | — | Get Wet |
| 1980 | "Egypt" | — | — | — | — | — | — | — | — | — | — | Get Wet |
| 1980 | "Come Around" | 18 | — | — | — | — | — | — | — | — | — | Espresso Bongo |
| 1980 | "(Just Like) Romeo and Juliet" | 27 | — | — | — | — | — | — | — | — | — | Non-album single |
| 1981 | "If You Leave Me, Can I Come Too?"^{[B]} | 4 | — | — | 16 | — | — | — | — | — | — | Cats & Dogs |
| 1981 | "Too Many Times" | 6 | 34 | — | 23 | — | — | — | — | — | — | Cats & Dogs |
| 1981 | "Berserk Warriors" | 30 | — | — | 50 | — | — | — | — | — | — | Cats & Dogs |
| 1982 | "I Didn't Mean to Be Mean" | 25 | — | — | — | — | — | — | — | — | — | Non-album single |
| 1982 | "Close Again" | 55 | — | — | — | — | — | — | — | — | — | Creatures of Leisure |
| 1983 | "Spirit Got Lost" | 20 | — | — | — | — | — | — | — | — | — | Creatures of Leisure |
| 1983 | "Brain Brain" | 82 | — | — | — | — | — | — | — | — | — | Creatures of Leisure |
| 1983 | "Working for the Man" | 20 | — | — | 49 | — | — | — | — | — | — | Non-album single |
| 1984 | "Apocalypso (Wiping the Smile off Santa's Face)" | 37 | — | — | — | — | — | — | — | — | — | Non-album single |
| 1985 | "You're So Strong"^{[D]} | 11 | — | — | — | 82 | 21 | — | — | — | — | Fundamental |
| 1985 | "Live It Up"^{[E]} | 2 | — | 2 | 6 | 3 | — | 15 | 6 | 4 | 20 | Fundamental |
| 1985 | "Date with Destiny" | 25 | — | — | — | — | — | — | — | — | — | Fundamental |
| 1985 | "Big Wheel" | 75 | — | — | — | — | — | — | — | — | — | Fundamental |
| 1986 | "Sloppy Croc" | — | — | — | — | — | — | — | — | — | — | Non-album single |
"—" denotes a recording that did not chart or was not released in that territory.

| Year | Title | Peak chart positions | | Album |
| Year | Title | AUS | UK | Album |
|---|---|---|---|---|
| 1986 | "Let's Go to Paradise" | 15 | — | Mouth to Mouth |
| 1987 | "He's Just No Good for You" | 15 | 88 | Mouth to Mouth |
| 1987 | "Don't Tell Me Now" | 36 | — | Mouth to Mouth |
| 1987 | "Love Me Tender" | 34 | — | Non-album single |
| 1988 | "If You Leave Me, Can I Come Too?" (new version)^{[B]} | — | — | Mouth to Mouth |
| 1988 | "Rock and Roll Music" | 5 | — | Young Einstein |
| 1989 | "Love Comes Running"^{[F]} | — | — | Cyclone Raymond |
| 1989 | "The World Seems Difficult" | 19 | — | Cyclone Raymond |
| 1989 | "Baby You're Wild" | 79 | — | Cyclone Raymond |
| 1990 | "Overwhelmed" | 108 | — | Cyclone Raymond |
| 1995 | "Mr Natural" | 27 | — | Liar Liar Pants on Fire |
| 1995 | "Nigel" | 115 | — | Liar Liar Pants on Fire |
| 1995 | "Whole Wide World" | 53 | — | Liar Liar Pants on Fire |
| 1996 | "Marianne" | 171 | — | Liar Liar Pants on Fire |
| 1998 | "Just My Luck" | 230 | — | Garàge |
| 1998 | "Calling Colin" | 255 | — | Garàge |
| 2001 | "Fine Line" | 228 | — | Beetroot Stains |
| 2001 | "Stretchmarks" (from Borscht EP)^{[G]} | — | — | Beetroot Stains |
| 2005 | "The Nips Are Getting Bigger"^{[A]} | — | — | Plucked |
"—" denotes a recording that did not chart or was not released in that territory.

| Year | Title | Peak chart positions | Album |
| Year | Title | AUS | Album |
|---|---|---|---|
| 2015 | "Shake Off Your Sandals" | — | 5 Track EP |
| 2016 | "Goat Tracks in My Sandpit" | — | 5 Track EP |
| 2017 | "The Luckiest Player" | — | 5 Track EP |
"—" denotes a recording that did not chart or was not released in that territory.

== Video albums ==
| Title | Video details |
|---|---|
| Monumental As Anything | Released: August 1985; Label: Syray Pty Ltd (CEL C802101); Format: VHS; Length: 85 Minutes |
| Monumental II | Released: 13 September 1999; Label: Festival (V81693); Format: VHS; Length: 78 minutes |
| Basemental | Released: May 2004; Label: EMI (5769929); Format: DVD; Length: 103 minutes |

== Music Videos ==
| Year | Title | Director | Notes |
|---|---|---|---|
| 1979 | "The Nips Are Getting Bigger" | Jeremy Fabinyi | |
| 1979 | "Possible Theme For A Future TV Drama Series" | not attributed | Filmed for ADS-7 "Music Express" |
| 1979 | "Business And Pleasure" | not attributed | Filmed for ADS-7 "Music Express" |
| 1980 | "Egypt" | John Moyle | |
| 1980 | "Come Around" | Peter Cox | |
| 1980 | "(Just Like) Romeo and Juliet" | Jeremy Fabinyi | |
| 1981 | "If You Leave Me Can I Come Too?" | Adam Bowen | Version 1 - exterior shots of band in Hobart and Sydney (on Monumental As Anything). Version 2 - studio performance shoot mixed with footage from Version 1 (broadcast version). |
| 1981 | "Too Many Times" | Esben Storm | |
| 1981 | "Got Hit" | Jeremy Fabinyi | |
| 1981 | "Ready For You Now" | Jeremy Fabinyi | |
| 1981 | "Berserk Warriors" | not known | Original performance version, not on Monumental videos |
| 1982 | "Let's Cook" | John Evan Hughes | |
| 1982 | "I Didn't Mean To Be Mean" | Adam Bowen | |
| 1982 | "Close Again" | John Evan Hughes | |
| 1983 | "Spirit Got Lost" | B# - Wilkinson/Scott/Gailey/Stauce | |
| 1983 | "Brain Brain" | B# - Wilkinson/Scott/Gailey/Stauce | |
| 1983 | "Working For The Man" | Mental As Anything / Larry Meltzer | |
| 1984 | "Apocalypso (Wiping the Smile off Santa's Face)" | B# - Wilkinson/Scott/Gailey/Stauce | |
| 1984 | "Wouldn't Try To Explain" | Mental As Anything | |
| 1985 | "Berserk Warriors" | Tony Stevens | Viking version for Monumental As Anything |
| 1985 | "You're So Strong" | John Evan Hughes | |
| 1985 | "Live It Up" | Kimble Rendall | |
| 1985 | "Date With Destiny" | not attributed | |
| 1985 | "Big Wheel" | Axolotl - Wilkinson/Stauce | |
| 1986 | "Let's Go To Paradise" | Kimble Rendall | |
| 1987 | "He's Just No Good For You" | Susan Davis / Mark Cochrane | 3 versions exist, each a different one shot take. |
| 1987 | "Don't Tell Me Now" | Ray Argall | |
| 1987 | "Love Me Tender" | Axolotl - Wilkinson/Stauce | |
| 1988 | "Rock and Roll Music" | Yahoo Serious | |
| 1989 | "Love Comes Running" | not known | Unreleased, held by NFSA |
| 1989 | "The World Seems Difficult" | Kriv Stenders | |
| 1989 | "Baby You're Wild" | Kriv Stenders | |
| 1990 | "Overwhelmed" | not attributed | |
| 1995 | "Mr Natural" | Axolotl - Wilkinson/Stauce | |
| 1995 | "Nigel" | John Wilkinson | |
| 1995 | "Whole Wide World" | John Wilkinson | |
| 1998 | "Just My Luck" | John Wilkinson | |
| 1998 | "Calling Colin" | John Wilkinson | |
| 2001 | "Fine Line" | not known | |
| 2001 | "Stretchmarks" | Garry Richards | |
| 2015 | "Shake Off Your Sandals" | see note | Made by Greedy Smith on a phone app |
| 2016 | "Goat Tracks In My Sandpit" | see note | One shot video of Martin Plaza playing guitar and signing |
| 2017 | "The Luckiest Player" | not attributed | |

== Notes ==
A."The Nips Are Getting Bigger" was originally released as a track on the EP, Mental as Anything Plays at Your Party in September 1978, it was remixed and released as a single in July 1979 and subsequently appeared on the album, Get Wet in September. An acoustic version from the Plucked album was released as a Radio Only single in 2005.
B."If You Leave Me, Can I Come Too?" was originally released in 1981 from the Cats & Dogs album. A new version was recorded for the UK version of Mouth to Mouth and released as a single in 1988 but it did not peak into the top 100 in the UK.
D."You're So Strong" was originally released in 1985, re-released in 1986 as a remixed version in the US and charted in the UK in 1987 after the success there of "Live It Up".
E."Live It Up" was originally released in Australia in 1985 and in 1986/1987 in Europe after it featured in "Crocodile" Dundee.
F."Love Comes Running" was cancelled from release in Australia and only issued in New Zealand where it failed to chart.
G."Stretchmarks" was originally released in 2000 as an album track on Beetroot Stains, then released in 2001 as the featured track on Borscht EP.
