= Best Of (Mental As Anything album) =

Compilation album by Mental As Anything
- Released: September 1999
- Recorded: 1979–1998
- Genre: Pop rock
- Length: 79:17
- Label: Festival Records
- Producer: various

Mental As Anything chronology
Garàge (1998)	Best Of (1999)	Beetroot Stains (2000)

Professional ratings
Review scores
Source	Rating
AllMusic	3.4/5 stars

Best Of is the third compilation album by Australian band Mental As Anything, released in September 1999. The album reached number 42 on the ARIA Charts and was certified gold.

== Track listing ==
No.	Title	Writer(s)	Album	Length
1.	"The Nips Are Getting Bigger"	Martin Plaza	Get Wet, 1979	3:20
2.	"Egypt"	Reg Mombassa	Get Wet, 1979	3:27
3.	"Come Around"	Martin Plaza	Espresso Bongo, 1980	3:03
4.	"(Just Like) Romeo and Juliet"	Bob Hamilton, Freddie Gorman	Non-album single, 1980	2:13
5.	"If You Leave Me, Can I Come Too?"	Martin Plaza	Cats & Dogs, 1981	2:54
6.	"Too Many Times"	Greedy Smith	Cats & Dogs, 1981	2:38
7.	"Berserk Warriors"	Peter O'Doherty	Cats & Dogs, 1981	3:26
8.	"Let's Cook"	Martin Plaza	Cats & Dogs, 1981	3:30
9.	"I Didn't Mean to Be Mean"	Martin Plaza	Non-album single, 1982	3:13
10.	"Close Again"	Peter O'Doherty	Creatures of Leisure, 1983	2:54
11.	"Spirit Got Lost"	Reg Mombassa, Andrew 'Greedy' Smith	Creatures of Leisure, 1983	2:57
12.	"Brain Brain"	Peter O'Doherty	Creatures of Leisure, 1983	4:26
13.	"Apocalypso"	Martin Plaza, Reg Mombassa	Non-album single, 1984	3:39
14.	"You're So Strong"	Andrew Greedy Smith	Fundamental, 1985	3:27
15.	"Live It Up"	Andrew Greedy Smith	Fundamental, 1985	3:49
16.	"Date with Destiny"	Andrew "Greedy" Smith	Fundamental, 1985	2:59
17.	"Surf & Mull & Sex & Fun"	Peter O'Doherty	Fundamental, 1985	3:40
18.	"Let's Go to Paradise"	Andrew Greedy Smith	Mouth to Mouth, 1987	3:11
19.	"He's Just No Good for You"	Andrew 'Greedy' Smith	Mouth to Mouth, 1987	3:25
20.	"Rock 'N' Roll Music"	Chuck Berry	Cyclone Raymond, 1989	3:01
21.	"The World Seems Difficult"	Andrew Greedy Smith	Cyclone Raymond, 1989	3:55
22.	"Mr Natural"	Martin Plaza	Liar Liar Pants on Fire, 1995	3:59
23.	"Nigel"	Reg Mombassa	Liar Liar Pants on Fire, 1995	2:48
24.	"Dorothy Parker's Hair"	Peter O'Doherty	Garage, 1998	3:47
Total length:				79:17

== Personnel ==
- Martin Plaza – lead vocals, guitar
- Wayne de Lisle – drums
- Reg Mombassa – guitar, vocals
- Greedy Smith – lead vocals, keyboards, harmonica
- Peter O'Doherty – bass, vocals

== Charts ==
Chart (1999)	Peak position
Australian Albums (ARIA)	42

== Certifications ==
Region	Certification	Certified units/sales
Australia (ARIA)	Gold	35,000^{^}
^{^} Shipments figures based on certification alone.
