= Close Again =

- 7 Inch Australian cover

Single by Mental As Anything

from the album Creatures of Leisure
- B-side: "Homing Pigeon"
- Released: November 1982
- Genre: Pop, Rock
- Length: 2:47
- Label: Regular Records
- Songwriter(s): Peter O'Doherty
- Producer(s): Bruce Brown; Russell Dunlop

Mental As Anything singles chronology
"Berserk Warriors" (1981)	"Close Again" (1982)	"Spirit Got Lost" (1982)

Close Again is a song recorded by Australian rock band Mental As Anything, released in 1982 through Regular Records. It was released as the first single from the band's fourth studio album Creatures of Leisure. The song charted at number 55 on December 6, 1982, and it stay in the charts for 16 weeks. The song was written by Peter O'Doherty.

== Track listing ==
Regular Records (RRT 604)
No.	Title	Writer(s)	Length
1.	"Close Again"	Peter O'Doherty	2:47
2.	"Homing Pigeon"	Martin Plaza	2:44

== Track listing ==
Regular Records (RRT 604)
No.	Title	Writer(s)	Length
1.	"Close Again"	Peter O'Doherty	2:47
2.	"Not Enough"	Martin Plaza, Reg Mombassa	2:50
3.	"Homing Pigeon"	Martin Plaza	2:51

== Personnel ==
- Martin Plaza — lead vocals, guitar
- Greedy Smith — lead vocals, keyboards, harmonica
- Reg Mombassa — guitar, vocals
- Peter O'Doherty — bass, guitar, vocals
- Wayne de Lisle – drums

== Charts ==
Chart (1982)	Peak position
Australian (Kent Music Report)	55
