= Berserk Warriors =

- 7-inch single New Zealand cover

Single by Mental As Anything

from the album Cats & Dogs
- B-side: "L'Amour No More"
- Released: December 1981
- Recorded: Albert Studios
- Genre: Pop, Rock
- Length: 3:49
- Label: Regular Records
- Songwriter: Peter O'Doherty
- Producers: Bruce Brown; Russell Dunlop

Mental As Anything singles chronology
"Too Many Times" (1981)	"Berserk Warriors" (1981)	"Close Again" (1982)

Berserk Warriors is a song by Australian band Mental As Anything, released in December 1981, through Regular Records. The song was written by band member Peter O'Doherty. It is a thinly veiled reference to the marital travails of the members of ABBA. It was released as the third and final single from the band's third album Cats & Dogs. The Song first charted on December 14, 1981, and it peaked at no. 30 on the Kent Music Report and it stayed in the charts for 16 weeks. The song Berserk Warriors was used in the 2010 movie Animal Kingdom.

== Track listing ==
Regular Records (K-8594)
No.	Title	Writer(s)	Length
1.	"Berserk Warriors"	Peter O'Doherty	3:49
2.	"L'Amour No More"	Reg Mombassa	2:20

== Personnel ==
- Martin Plaza — lead vocals, guitar
- Greedy Smith — lead vocals, keyboards, harmonica
- Reg Mombassa — guitar, vocals
- Peter O'Doherty — bass, guitar, vocals
- Wayne de Lisle – drums

== Charts ==
Chart (1981–82)	Peak position
Australian (Kent Music Report)	30
New Zealand (Recorded Music NZ)	50
