= Come Around (Mental As Anything song) =

Single by Mental As Anything

from the album Espresso Bongo
- B-side: "DC 10"
- Released: May 1980
- Genre: Rock
- Length: 3:03
- Label: Regular Records
- Songwriter(s): Martin Plaza
- Producer(s): Cameron Allan

Mental As Anything singles chronology
"Egypt" (1980)	"Come Around" (1980)	"(Just Like) Romeo and Juliet" (1980)

Come Around is a song by Australian band Mental As Anything, released in May 1980. as the only single from the group second album, Espresso Bongo. The song peaked at number 18 on the Kent Music Report Singles Chart. The song was written by their lead singer and guitarist, Martin Plaza.

== Track listing ==
Regular Records (K7899)
No.	Title	Writer(s)	Length
1.	"Come Around"	Martin Plaza	3:03
2.	"DC 10"	Peter O'Doherty, Greedy Smith	2:29

== Personnel ==
- Martin Plaza — lead vocals, guitar
- Greedy Smith — lead vocals, keyboards, harmonica
- Reg Mombassa — guitar, vocals
- Peter O'Doherty — bass, guitar, vocals
- Wayne de Lisle – drums

== Charts ==
=== Weekly charts ===
Chart (1980)	Peak position
Australian (Kent Music Report)	18

=== Year-end charts ===
Chart (1980)	Position
Australia (Kent Music Report)	94
