= If You Leave Me, Can I Come Too? =

Single by Mental As Anything

from the album Cats & Dogs
- B-side: "Assault And Flattery"
- Released: May 1981 (Aus)
- Length: 3:12
- Label: Regular Records
- Songwriter(s): Martin Plaza
- Producer(s): Russell Dunlop, Bruce Brown

Mental As Anything singles chronology
"(Just Like) Romeo and Juliet" (1980)	"If You Leave Me, Can I Come Too?" (1981)	"Too Many Times" (1981)

Music video
- "If You Leave Me, Can I Come Too?" on YouTube

"If You Leave Me, Can I Come Too?" is a song by Australian band Mental As Anything, released in May 1981 as the lead single from their third studio album Cats & Dogs. The song peaked at number 4 on the Kent Music Report.

At the 1981 Countdown Music Awards, the song won Best Australian Single.

== Reception ==
Junkee Media described it as, "a gonzo anti-break-up song with a melody line as big and gaudy as one of Jeff Koons' flower dogs, is a cartoon in and of itself. It’s the kind of thing you'd expect to see scribbled on the side of a wall, rather than playing on the radio. And that's its genius."

== Track listing ==
Regular Records (K 8305)
No.	Title	Writer(s)	Length
1.	"If You Leave Me, Can I Come Too?"	Martin Plaza	2:16
2.	"Assault And Flattery"	Reg Mombassa	2:45

== Personnel ==
- Martin Plaza – lead vocals, guitar
- Greedy Smith – lead vocals, keyboards, harmonica
- Reg Mombassa – guitar, vocals
- Peter O'Doherty – bass, guitar, vocals
- Wayne de Lisle – drums

== Charts ==
Weekly chart performance for "If You Leave Me, Can I Come Too?"
Chart (1981)	Peak position
Australia (Kent Music Report)	4
New Zealand (Recorded Music NZ)	16

=== Year-end charts ===
Year-end chart performance for "If You Leave Me, Can I Come Too?"
Chart (1981)	Position
Australia (Kent Music Report)	39
