= Date with Destiny =

"Date With Destiny"

Single by Mental As Anything

from the album Fundamental
- B-side: "Surf & Mull & Sex & Fun"
- Released: September 1985
- Genre: Rock
- Length: 3:04
- Label: WEA
- Songwriter: Greedy Smith
- Producer: Richard Gottehrer

Mental As Anything singles chronology
"Live It Up" (1985)	"Date With Destiny" (1985)	"Big Wheel" (1985)

Music video
- "Date With Destiny" on YouTube

"Date with Destiny" is a song by Australian pop rock band Mental As Anything, released in 1985 through WEA. The song was written by Greedy Smith. The song first charted on 9 September 1985, peaked at No. 25 on the Kent Music Report, and stayed in the charts for eleven weeks. It was released as the third single from the band's fifth studio album Fundamental.

== Track listing ==
WEA
No.	Title	Writer(s)	Length
1.	"Date With Destiny"	Greedy Smith	3:04
2.	"Surf & Mull & Sex & Fun"	Peter O'Doherty	3:39

== Personnel ==
- Martin Plaza — lead vocals, guitar
- Greedy Smith — lead vocals, keyboards, harmonica
- Reg Mombassa — guitar, vocals
- Peter O'Doherty — bass, guitar, vocals
- Wayne de Lisle – drums

== Charts ==
Chart (1985)	Peak position
Australian (Kent Music Report)	25
