= (Just Like) Romeo and Juliet =

1964 single by The Reflections

Single by The Reflections

from the album (Just Like) Romeo and Juliet
- B-side: "Can't You Tell By the Look in My Eyes"
- Released: February 1964
- Recorded: 1963
- Studio: United Sound Systems, Detroit (instrumental track); RCA Studios, Chicago (vocal track)
- Genre: Pop, doo-wop
- Length: 2:17
- Label: Golden World
- Songwriters: Bob Hamilton, Freddie Gorman
- Producer: Rob Reeco

The Reflections singles chronology
"You Said Goodbye" (1963)	"(Just Like) Romeo and Juliet" (1964)	"Like Columbus Did" (1964)

"(Just Like) Romeo and Juliet" is a song written by Bob Hamilton and Freddie Gorman, first made famous by the 1964 hit recording by the Reflections. The song is the first person narrative of a young man who plans to find a job so that he can buy his girlfriend presents and a car to take her out on dates. He fears that if he fails to find gainful employ, their love will fall apart, a situation he likens to the famous tragedy Romeo and Juliet. The song is widely regarded to be among the final doo-wop singles to chart on the Billboard Hot 100 during the British Invasion era.

== Background ==
Ed Wingate, owner of the newly formed Detroit-based Golden World Records, had signed the Reflections on the basis of the group's regional success with the single "You Said Goodbye" on the local Kay-Ko label. Songwriter Freddie Gorman, who had been recruited by Golden World from Motown, would recall that he considered his recent composition "(Just Like) Romeo and Juliet" as "tailor made" for the doo-wop-styled Reflections "because it had a pop feel, as opposed to the R&B thing they were doing." However Reflections' lead singer Tony Micale recalls that none of the group responded positively to the song when Gorman first sang it for them: "It just didn't sound like much with [Gorman] just playing a little piano backup".

The Reflections recorded the vocal for the track several weeks later at the RCA recording studio in Chicago. According to Micale, the group's members still regarded the song as somewhat of a joke. While running through the song prior to the recording session they ad-libbed a falsetto "doo-doo-doot" hook line as irreverent mimicry of Gorman's vocal style when he had pitched them the song. The group was surprised when Gorman added that line to the song's vocal arrangement. The instrumental track for "(Just Like) Romeo and Juliet" had been recorded at United Sound Systems in Detroit. Micale would recall that when the group's members first heard that instrumental track through the [RCA] studio monitors "we were just blown away... Some of the Motown [session musicians] were playing on it, and the sound was just amazing. Besides our vocals, the only thing added at that point were [the] 'doo-doo-doot's that we had come up with, and hand claps".

== Chart history ==
First aired on CKLW in Windsor, Ontario in February 1964, the single topped the hit parade of CKLW, as well as those of Detroit radio stations WJBK and WKNR in March 1964. "(Just Like) Romeo and Juliet" made its national chart debut on the Billboard Hot 100 dated April 11, 1964, ranked at #86 and rose to a Hot 100 peak of #6 on the chart dated May 30, 1964. In New Zealand, the song reached #5.

=== Weekly charts ===
Chart (1964)	Peak position
Canada RPM Top Singles	20
Canada (CHUM Hit Parade)	16
New Zealand (Lever Hit Parade)	5
US Billboard Hot 100	6
US Cash Box R&B	3

=== Year-end charts ===
Chart (1964)	Rank
U.S. Billboard Hot 100	64
U.S. Cash Box	60

== Cover versions ==
- Garage-rock band Michael and the Messengers released a cover version of the song as a single in 1967. While their recording failed to crack the Hot 100, it eventually gained recognition due to its inclusion on the 1972 compilation album Nuggets: Original Artyfacts from the First Psychedelic Era, 1965–1968.
- In 1969 a psychedelic rock band from Boston, Ultimate Spinach, released their cover version as a single, but it failed to chart. It was also included in their third and final album Ultimate Spinach III.
- "(Just Like) Romeo and Juliet" returned to the Hot 100 in 1975 via a remake by Sha Na Na which, despite falling short of the Top 40 with a #55 peak, and #47 on the Easy Listening chart, was the group's most successful single.
- A rival remake by Fallen Angels, also in 1975, reached #106 on the bubbling under the Hot 100 chart.
- The song has also been recorded by Little Caesar and the Consuls (album Little Caesar and the Consuls, 1965), The Outsiders (album Album #2, 1966), and Stephen Bishop (album Blue Guitars, 1996). The Austin, TX honky-tonk band Jim Stringer and the AM Band released their version of the song as a single in 2020.
- The song was covered by Carla Olson on her album Have Harmony, Will Travel 3.

== Mental As Anything's version ==
(Just Like) Romeo and Juliet" was recorded by Australian band Mental As Anything, released in November 1980 and it reached #27 on the Kent Music Report.

"(Just Like) Romeo and Juliet"

Single by Mental As Anything
- B-side: "Go Down"
- Released: November 1980
- Genre: Pop, Rock
- Length: 2:12
- Label: Regular Records
- Songwriters: Bob Hamilton, Freddie Gorman
- Producer: Cameron Allan

Mental As Anything singles chronology
"Come Around" (1980)	"(Just Like) Romeo and Juliet" (1980)	"If You Leave Me, Can I Come Too?" (1981)

=== Track listing ===
Regular Records (K8115)
No.	Title	Writer(s)	Length
1.	"(Just Like) Romeo And Juliet"	Bob Hamilton, Freddie Gorman	2:12
2.	"Go Down"	Martin Plaza	2:44

=== Personnel ===
- Martin Plaza — lead vocals, guitar
- Greedy Smith — lead vocals, keyboards, harmonica
- Reg Mombassa — guitar, vocals
- Peter O'Doherty — bass, guitar, vocals
- Wayne de Lisle – drums

=== Charts ===
Chart (1980/81)	Peak position
Australian (Kent Music Report)	27

== See also ==
- List of 1960s one-hit wonders in the United States
