= Too Many Times (Mental As Anything song) =

Single by Mental As Anything

from the album Cats & Dogs
- B-side: "Holiday In Auckland"
- Released: September 1981
- Genre: Rock
- Length: 2:49
- Label: Regular Records
- Songwriter: Greedy Smith
- Producers: Russell Dunlop, Bruce Brown

Mental As Anything singles chronology
"If You Leave Me, Can I Come Too?" (1981)	"Too Many Times" (1981)	"Berserk Warriors" (1981)

Music video
- "Too Many Times" on YouTube

"Too Many Times" is a song by Australian rock band Mental As Anything, released in September 1981 as the second single from their third studio album, Cats & Dogs. The song peaked at number 6 on the Kent Music Report.

== Track listing ==
Regular Records (8437)
No.	Title	Writer(s)	Length
1.	"Too Many Times"	Greedy Smith	2:49
2.	"Holiday In Auckland"	Martin Plaza, Reg Mombassa	2:38

== Personnel ==
- Martin Plaza — lead vocals, guitar
- Greedy Smith — lead vocals, keyboards, harmonica
- Reg Mombassa — guitar, vocals
- Peter O'Doherty — bass, guitar, vocals
- Wayne de Lisle – drums

== Charts ==
=== Weekly charts ===
Chart (1981/82)	Peak position
Australian (Kent Music Report)	6
Canada (RPM Top Singles)	34
New Zealand (Recorded Music NZ)	23

=== Year-end charts ===
Year-end chart performance for "Too Many Times"
Chart (1981)	Position
Australia (Kent Music Report)	68
