= Espresso Bongo =

Studio album by Mental As Anything
- Released: July 1980
- Recorded: Music Farm Studio, Byron Bay, Australia
- Genre: Pop
- Label: Regular
- Producer: Cameron Allan

Mental As Anything chronology
Get Wet (1979)	Espresso Bongo (1980)	Cats & Dogs (1981)

Singles from Espresso Bongo
- 1. "Come Around" Released: June 1980

Professional ratings
Review scores
Source	Rating
AllMusic	2/5 stars

Espresso Bongo is the second studio album released by Mental As Anything. It was released in July 1980, and peaked at #37 on the Australian Album charts.

== Recording ==
Greedy Smith later said the recording, "just got away from us all together. We'd only learned the songs the week before we recorded them, and then we put them down in seven days."

O'Doherty later recalled, "we did it in six days under the influence of all sorts of terrible things. It's one of my favourites and it's the weirdest album we've done but it could have been played a lot better and done a lot cleaner."

== Reception ==
AllMusic said, "Sounding like it consists of songs leftover from the sessions for their debut, Espresso Bongo does no one any favors, although it is not a bad album. Cameron Allan's production is even flatter than before, sucking almost all the excitement out of what could have been an exciting album." The efforts of Martin Plaza are described as "buried". Jane Gazzo said it, "suffered from rushed production and experimental recording sessions fuelled by local mushrooms."

Rip It Up said "The hooks are just as subtle, but growing songwriting expertise and excellent production mean that the sound is smoother, and the band no longer wear their influences like badges". The subject matter was said to be, "that great Australian institution, suburbia".

== Track listing ==
Side A

1. "Troop Movements in the Ukraine"
2. "Semi Trailer"
3. "Missing Plane"
4. "Insect Liberation"
5. "Won't Let Me Drive"
6. "Come Around"

Side B

1. "Harmonic Visions"
2. "Away"
3. "Cannibal"
4. "Blacktown to Bondi"
5. "The Girl"
6. "Live Now Pay Later"

== Personnel ==
=== Musicians ===
- Martin Plaza — lead vocals, guitar
- Greedy Smith — lead vocals, keyboards, harmonica
- Reg Mombassa — guitar, vocals
- Peter O'Doherty — bass, guitar, vocals
- Wayne de Lisle — drums

=== Recording details ===
- Cameron Allan — producer
- Jim Blackfoot — engineer

== Charts ==
Chart (1980)	Peak position
Australian (Kent Music Report)	37

== Certifications and sales ==
Region	Certification	Certified units/sales
Australia (ARIA)	Platinum	50,000^{^}
^{^} Shipments figures based on certification alone.

== Release history ==
Region	Date	Label	Format	Catalogue
Australia / New Zealand	July 1980	Regular Records	Vinyl LP, Cassette	L 37358 / C 37358
Australia	1992	Regular Records	CD	D19561
