= Cats & Dogs (Mental As Anything album) =

Studio album by Mental As Anything
- Released: September 1981
- Studio: Albert Studios, Sydney, Australia
- Genre: Pop
- Length: 39:24
- Label: Regular Records
- Producer: Russell Dunlop, Bruce Brown (plus, on various international versions, Cameron Allan and/or Elvis Costello)

Mental As Anything chronology
Espresso Bongo (1980)	Cats & Dogs (1981)	Creatures of Leisure (1983)

Singles from Cats & Dogs
- 1. "If You Leave Me, Can I Come Too?" Released: May 1981; 2. "Too Many Times" Released: September 1981; 3. "Berserk Warriors" Released: December 1981

Cats & Dogs is the third studio album by Australian band Mental As Anything. It was released in September 1981, produced by Bruce Brown and Russell Dunlop, the album peaked at #3 on the Australian chart and #2 on the New Zealand Album charts.

At the 1981 Countdown Music Awards, the album was nominated for Best Australian Album.

Cats & Dogs was released in the USA and Europe as If You Leave Me, Can I Come Too?.

In October 2010, Cats & Dogs was listed in the top 50 in the book, 100 Best Australian Albums having previously been listed in similar polls in the music magazines Rolling Stone, Juice and The Edge.

== Recording ==
Greedy Smith claimed this was their first "proper" album: "With the first one, we didn't know what we wanted or what we should sound like, and the second one just got away from us all together. This time, we put our foot down with the record company and said we wanted more time. We were able to put tracks down, then leave them and think about them."

== Reception ==
Professional ratings
Review scores
Source	Rating
AllMusic	4.5/5 stars

AllMusic said, "the Mentals created their first true 'classic' album, which takes the best elements from their debut album and betters them by leaps and bounds. Everyone in the band shines on this album, from Martin Plaza's warm drawl to Reg Mombassa's amazing slide fretwork and Greedy Smith's confident and playful keyboards."

Rip It Up agreed the album was, "generally acknowledged as the Mentals' most accomplished album, where their diverse ideas came together consistently."

Cash Box reviewed the revised American version of the album called If You Leave Me Can I Come Too?, which has a slightly different track listing. They claimed "This album of down under 'punk funk and beatnik rockabilly' is actually comprised of selections from two previously released gold Aussie albums and a peppy single produced by Elvis Costello entitled 'I Didn't Mean to Be Mean'. Look for AOR, pop and progressive play on these shores, especially in the wake of the success of antipodean peers Men At Work."

== Track listing ==
=== Australian & New Zealand Editions ===
Cats & Dogs [Australian & New Zealand release]
No.	Title	Writer(s)	Length
1.	"Too Many Times"	Andrew 'Greedy' Smith	2:52
2.	"Walking on Rails"	Reg Mombassa	2:34
3.	"If You Leave Me, Can I Come Too?"	Martin Plaza	3:12
4.	"Berserk Warriors"	Peter O'Doherty	3:51
5.	"Let's Cook"	Martin Plaza	2:30
6.	"Got Hit"	Peter O'Doherty	3:14
7.	"Ready for You Now"	Martin Plaza	2:42
8.	"Looking for Bird"	Wayne Delisle, Reg Mombassa, Martin Plaza	3:41
9.	"Chemical Travel"	Reg Mombassa	2:57
10.	"Catalina's Reward"	Martin Plaza	3:10
11.	"Psychedelic Peace Lamp"	Reg Mombassa	3:05
12.	"Sad Poetry"	Andrew Smith	2:50
13.	"Hararei I Akarana"	Martin Plaza, Reg Mombassa	1:56

=== Canadian edition ===
The Canadian edition of Cats & Dogs dropped the album's final five tracks ("Chemical Travel", "Catalina's Reward", "Psychedelic Peace Lamp", "Sad Poetry", and "Hararei I Akarana"), and added two earlier singles ("The Nips Are Getting Bigger", and "Egypt", both of which had originally appeared on Get Wet.)

Cats & Dogs [Canadian release]
No.	Title	Writer(s)	Length
1.	"Too Many Times"	Andrew 'Greedy' Smith	2:52
2.	"Let's Cook"	Martin Plaza	2:30
3.	"If You Leave Me Can I Come Too?"	Martin Plaza	3:12
4.	"Berserk Warriors"	Peter O'Doherty	3:51
5.	"Got Hit"	Peter O'Doherty	3:14
6.	"The Nips Are Getting Bigger" (Produced by Cameron Allan from Get Wet)	Martin Plaza	3:19
7.	"Walking on Rails"	Reg Mombassa	2:34
8.	"Ready for You Now"	Martin Plaza	2:42
9.	"Looking for Bird"	Wayne Delisle, Reg Mombassa, Martin Plaza	3:41
10.	"Egypt" (Produced by Cameron Allan from Get Wet)	Reg Mombassa	2:42

=== US edition ===
The American edition of Cats & Dogs, re-titled If You Leave Me, Can I Come Too?, dropped four tracks ("Chemical Travel", "Catalina's Reward", "Psychedelic Peace Lamp", and "Hararei I Akarana"), and added "The Nips Are Getting Bigger", "Egypt", and the newly recorded single "I Didn't Mean to Be Mean" (produced by Elvis Costello).

If You Leave Me, Can I Come Too? [USA release]
No.	Title	Writer(s)	Length
1.	"If You Leave Me Can I Come Too?"	Martin Plaza	3:12
2.	"Let's Cook"	Martin Plaza	2:30
3.	"Too Many Times"	Andrew 'Greedy' Smith	2:52
4.	"Got Hit"	Peter O'Doherty	3:14
5.	"Looking for Bird"	Wayne Delisle, Reg Mombassa, Martin Plaza	3:41
6.	"Ready for You Now"	Martin Plaza	2:42
7.	"I Didn't Mean to Be Mean" (Produced By Elvis Costello)	Martin Plaza	3:25
8.	"Walking on Rails"	Reg Mombassa	2:34
9.	"Sad Poetry"	Andrew Smith	2:50
10.	"The Nips Are Getting Bigger" (Produced by Cameron Allan from Get Wet)	Martin Plaza	3:19
11.	"Egypt" (Produced by Cameron Allan from Get Wet)	Reg Mombassa	2:42
12.	"Berserk Warriors"	Peter O'Doherty	3:51

=== UK and European edition ===
The UK and European edition of Cats & Dogs was resequenced, remixed and re-titled If You Leave Me, Can I Come Too?. It included all tracks from the Australian edition ("Harerei I Akarana" was renamed "Holiday in Auckland"), and added "I Didn't Mean to Be Mean". All the tracks were remixed by Dunlop and Brown, in some cases resulting in significantly different timings from the tracks on the original Australian/NZ release. Also note that the version of "I Didn't Mean to Be Mean" included on this album uses a different vocal take than the Australian single mix.

If You Leave Me, Can I Come Too? [UK & European release]
No.	Title	Writer(s)	Length
1.	"If You Leave Me Can I Come Too?"	Martin Plaza	3:11
2.	"Let's Cook"	Martin Plaza	2:30
3.	"Too Many Times"	Andrew 'Greedy' Smith	2:45
4.	"Got Hit"	Peter O'Doherty	3:10
5.	"Looking for Bird"	Wayne Delisle, Reg Mombassa, Martin Plaza	3:40
6.	"Ready for You Now"	Martin Plaza	2:40
7.	"Chemical Travel"	Reg Mombassa	3:00
8.	"I Didn't Mean to Be Mean" (Produced By Elvis Costello)	Martin Plaza	3:25
9.	"Walking on Rails"	Reg Mombassa	2:34
10.	"Sad Poetry"	Andrew Smith	2:50
11.	"Berserk Warriors"	Peter O'Doherty	3:45
12.	"Psychedelic Peace Lamp"	Reg Mombassa	3:02
13.	"Catalina's Reward"	Martin Plaza	3:11
14.	"Holiday in Auckland"	Martin Plaza, Reg Mombassa	1:53

== Personnel ==
=== Musicians ===
- Martin Plaza — lead vocals, guitar
- Greedy Smith — lead vocals, keyboards, harmonica
- Reg Mombassa — guitar, vocals
- Peter O'Doherty — bass, guitar, vocals
- Wayne de Lisle — drums

=== Recording details ===
- Bruce Brown — producer, engineer
- Russell Dunlop — producer, engineer

== Charts ==
Chart (1981/82)	Peak position
Australian (Kent Music Report)	3
Canada (RPM (magazine))	44
New Zealand Albums (RMNZ)	2

=== Year-end charts ===
Chart (1982)	Position
New Zealand Albums (RMNZ)	49

== Certifications and sales ==
Region	Certification	Certified units/sales
Australia (ARIA)	Platinum	50,000^{^}
^{^} Shipments figures based on certification alone.

== Release history ==
Region	Date	Label	Format	Catalogue
Australia & New Zealand	September 1981	Regular Records	Vinyl LP, Cassette	L37646
UK & Europe	1982	A&M Records	Vinyl LP, Cassette	AMLH64921
Canada	November 1982	Solid Gold Records	Vinyl LP, Cassette	SGR1009
United States	November 1982	A&M Records	Vinyl LP, Cassette	SP4921
Australia	1992	Regular Records	CD	D19562
