= Dog Trumpet =

Australian musical group

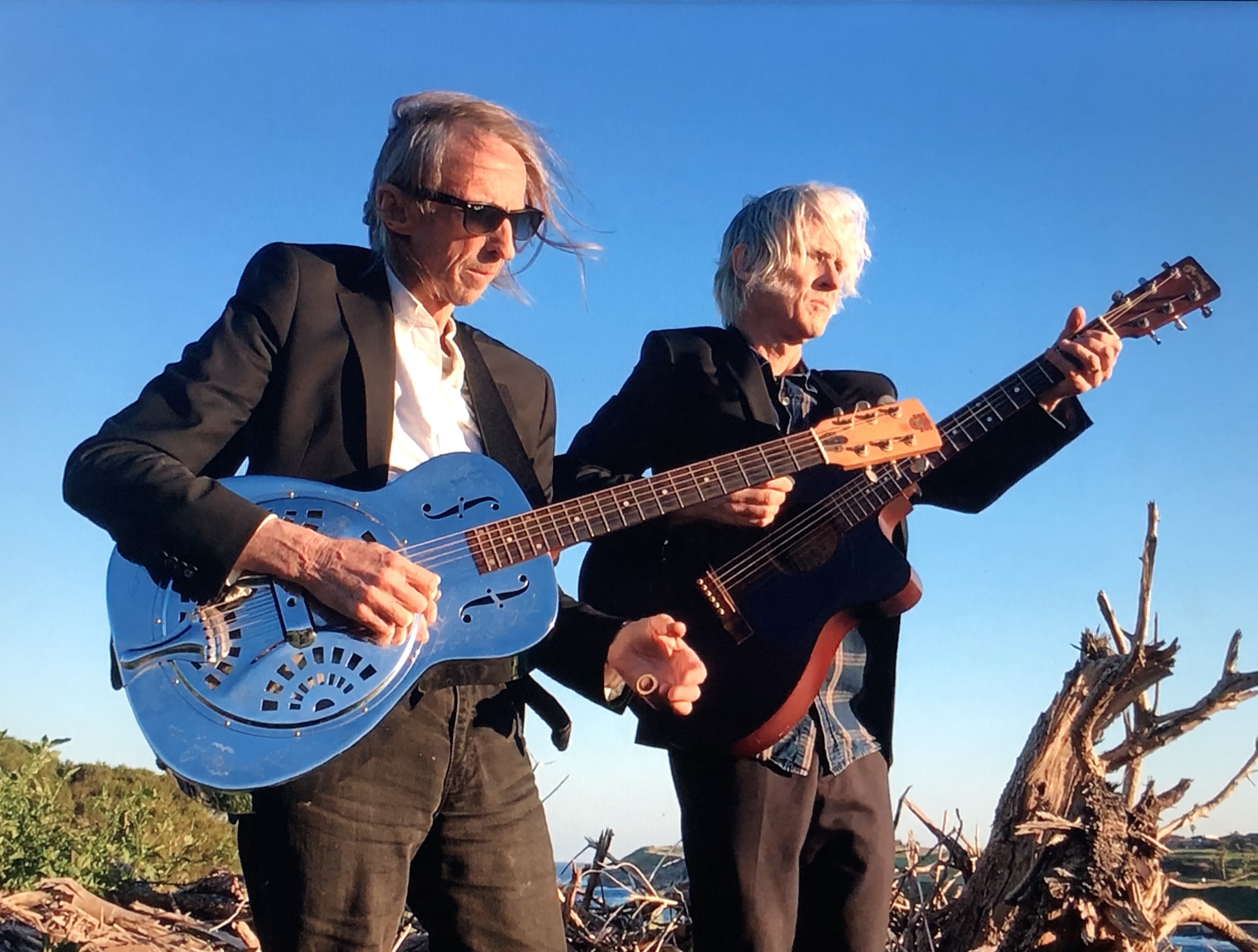

Background information
- Also known as: Reg & Peter/Peter & Reg
- Origin: Sydney, New South Wales, Australia
- Genres: Rock, pop, psychedelic folk
- Years active: 1990–present
- Labels: Regular, TWA, Half a Cow, Electric Entertainment, Orange Lounge, Demon Music Group
- Members: Declan O'Doherty; Bernie Hayes; Reg Mombassa; Peter O'Doherty
- Past members: Jim Elliott; John Bliss; Amanda Brown; Jess Ciampa; Mike Gubb; Mark Honeybrook; Tony Martin; Peter Mitchell; Iain Shedden; Hamish Stuart; Andy Travers; Jonathan Zwartz
- Website: dogtrumpet.net

Dog Trumpet, originally known as Reg & Peter's Dog Trumpet, is an Australian rock band, founded in 1990 by brothers Reg Mombassa (a.k.a. Chris O'Doherty) and Peter O'Doherty, original members of Australian new wave and pop rock band Mental As Anything. The brothers formed dogtrumpet.net as an outlet for their own material. The Dog Trumpet sound reflects affection for 1960s pop and psychedelia. They have released eight albums and three EPs.

== Biography ==
In 1990, Mental As Anything members had agreed to take a sabbatical from their band work and turned to solo or side projects. Mombassa and O'Doherty formed the duo Reg & Peter/Peter & Reg (they alternated names whenever interviewed). Under the name of Reg & Peter, the duo issued the single "Jean"/"Nobody Home" in March 1991 on Regular Records, the song is described by Mombassa as "a fusion of psychedelic and Celtic rock 'n 'roll dealing with metaphysical romance", before assuming the name Reg & Peter's Dog Trumpet for the album Two Heads One Brain. The album made the Rolling Stone's list of top albums for the year. Two further singles were lifted from the album, "Made of Wood"/"Red Brick Home" in June 1991 (the cover art for which is a painting of a howling dog trumpet by Mombassa) and "I'm So Handsome"/"Dream" in October 1991. The name "Dog Trumpet" came from a piece of Mombassa's artwork which featured a creature resembling a cross between a dog, a trumpet and a jet engine. The album was produced by Steve James and helping out in the studio were Mike Gubb (keyboards; ex-Dynamic Hepnotics, Mental as Anything, The Whitlams), John Bliss (drums; ex-The Reels) and Mark Honeybrook (bass).

The next two years saw the release of two EPs, Kiss a Gun Down in October 1992 and Strange Brew in October 1993. Film clips were made for "Beast of Prey" and "Melancholy Way", although they were not released as singles. Strange Brew was an inspired reworking of the old Cream song. The artwork for Strange Brew, was painted by Martin Sharp, who designed several album covers for the real Cream in the late 1960s. Tony Martin had replaced Honeybrook on bass.

After that, Mental as Anything re-emerged to tour and record, with Dog Trumpet put on the back-burner. In 1996, Reg and Pete revived Dog Trumpet and issued the album Suitcase. Backing the duo in the studio were Tony Martin, Andy Travers (drums; ex-the Happening Thang) and Amanda Brown (violin, backing vocals; ex-The Go-Betweens). "Suitcase" was released as a single on TWA Records in 1996, with "Into the Bible" released by TWA as a radio single in 1997 (the cover picture of a lecturing monster is by Mombassa).

The band's third album, Dog Trumpet, was recorded over a period of years and was engineered and produced by O'Doherty on an old sixteen track reel to reel in the spare room of his flat in Coogee. It was released in February 2002 on Half A Cow Records. Aside from regular drummers, they used Terepai Richmond for some tracks. The cover is a painting by Mombassa of him and his brother Peter when they were small children.

Dog Trumpet released their fourth album Antisocial Tendencies in March 2007 on Half A Cow Records. The album features a cover of "Lili Marlene", a popular World War II song made famous by Marlene Dietrich.

In 2008 Mombassa and O'Doherty began recording songs for the next Dog Trumpet album, uploading a demo of "The Great South Road", a new song from the forthcoming album, on their MySpace website in December 2008. The album, River of Flowers, was released on 28 May 2010.

Early August 2013, Dog Trumpet released the double album 'Medicated Spirits' through Orange Lounge Recordings. The album has been short-listed for the 'Australian Music Prize' Australian Album of the Year. The band have also been invited to attend SXSW in March 2014.

Playing various Festivals all over from "Port Fairy Folk Festival", "Bluesfest", "Blue Mountains Music Festival", "SXSW". Dog Trumpet lost their talented Drummer/Journalist Iain Shedden in 2017.

Dog Trumpet's seventh album, Great South Road, was released in May 2020 and featured the singles "Gravity", "Wallpaper", "Lonely Death Cleaning Company", "You've Heard it All Before" and "Overseas and Elsewhere". The album garnered great reviews and because of COVID19 the brothers decided to do various performances live on Facebook to promote the album.

In 2021, their back catalogue was released digitally, with vinyl records released on 29 October 2021 via Demon Records. A new single and video, "F**king Idiots", was released 20 May 2022. Dog Trumpet released a further single. "The Ballad of Clayton Looby" on 9 September 2022, from their forthcoming album, Shadowland, which is scheduled to be released on 4 November 2022, on vinyl, CD and digitally worldwide by the Demon Music Group. The video for "The Ballad of Clayton Looby", contains footage from some of Australia's 1970s surf films, including Alby Falzon's Morning of the Earth and Phil and Russell Shepard's A Winter’s Tale and Paul Witzig's The Lost Witzig Reels. "Nina Simone" the third single from Shadowland, was released on 7 October 2022.

"In 1987 I was on tour in London visiting a friend from Sydney who was living there at the time. We spent a few days together looking at the sites, going to galleries, combing second hand shops and markets. One Sunday she bought shoes and I bought her a book and Nina Simone’s first record Little Girl Blue which we took back to her bedsit. Little did we know we’d still be together today". - Peter O’Doherty

Shadowland is a distinctive blending of psychedelia, folk and blues, the album probes the perils and absurdities of human existence, kicking off with the title track "Shadowland", a nervous musing on digital over-surveillance; followed by "Nina Simone", a song reflecting on romance and memory. "F***ing Idiots points" out the shameful idiocy of our addiction to war and militarism; "The Ballad of Clayton Looby" is an anti-establishment ode to a larrikin surfer.

"Space and Time" is the first single from the forthcoming new album, it is a fun song about our universe. It was released on 24 May 2024. Dog Trumpet performed at Vivid Sydney in front of a Reg Mombassa animated artwork "Gumscape with Road and Creatures", which runs for the Vivid Festival.

Dog Trumpet released a new single, "Marianne" on 27 September 2024, a song about Marianne Faithfull.

I was inspired to write it after reading her vivid and colourful memoir 'Faithfull' in 1994. First recorded and released by Mental As Anything a year later, the track was sent to her in England. We heard back that she liked it. While she was touring Australia in 1996 Reg and I met her at a party in Sydney at artist Martin Sharp’s house where she told us how much the song meant to her. Martin had the record and she danced as it was played on the stereo. As a songwriter that was a high-water mark. Recently Dog Trumpet started playing Marianne at gigs and we decided to re-record it with a new approach and sound and updated lyrics.

— Peter O’Doherty 2024

Their latest single, "Live Forever", is an uptempo pop rock song. The lyrics are impressionistic and slightly ambivalent, expressing a fear of good and bad things and questioning any desire to live forever. The song is the title track from their ninth album, Live Forever, which is set to be released in July 2025.

"Although Reg Mombassa and Peter O’Doherty have been creating music for 50+ years, their passion and desire to create something new and exciting still burns bright in Dog Trumpet. For many years, they scaled the upper regions of the Australian charts as members of Mental as Anything, yet their music has always remained down-to-earth and honest. With warmth, humor, and love, they deliver "Live Forever", a melodic slice of laid-back, Blues-inspired Rock… or is it Rock-inspired Blues? In either case, this is a song that is as comforting as the smell of the beer-soaked wooden floors at your local pub and as warm as a late-night chat with the spirit of your dearly departed beloved. In short, this is exactly what you want from Dog Trumpet. Bless 'em!”

— Stephen Schnee USA

== Members ==
Current members

- Reg Mombassa — guitar, vocals (1990–present)
- Peter O'Doherty — guitar, mandolin, bass (1990–present)
- Bernie Hayes – bass, vocals, (2002–present)
- Declan O'Doherty – Drums, (2023–present)

Former members

- Mike Gubb – keyboards (1991–1993)
- Mark Honeybrook – bass (1991–1992)
- Tony Martin – bass (1992–1993, 1996)
- Amanda Brown — violin, vocals (1996, 2002)
- Andy Travers – drums (1996, 2002)
- Jess Ciampa – drums (2002, 2007)
- Hamish Stuart – drums (2002, 2007)
- Jonathan Zwartz — bass (2002)
- Peter Mitchell – harmonica (2007)
- Iain Shedden - drums (2012 - 2017) Died 2017
- Jim Elliot - drums, (2017 - 2023)
- John Bliss – drums (1991–1993)

== Discography ==
=== Albums ===
Title	Details
Two Heads One Brain	Released: 1991; Label: Regular (D 30577)
Suitcase	Released: January 1996; Label: TWA (TWAD106)
Dog Trumpet	Released: February 2002; Label: Half A Cow (hac101)
Antisocial Tendencies	Released: March 2007; Label: Half A Cow (hac126)
River of Flowers	Released: May 2010; Label: Half A Cow (hac141)
Medicated Spirits	Released: August 2013; Label: Orange Lounge Recordings (ORANGECD2002)
Great South Road	Released: May 2020; Label: Electric Entertainment (EE100)
Shadowland	Released: 4 November 2022; Label: Demon Music Group (DEMREC1076) LP; (EDSL 0131) CD
Live Forever	Released 11 July 2025; Label: Demon Music Group

=== EPs ===
Title	Details
Kiss a Gun Down	Released: October 1992; Label: Regular (D 11332)
Strange Brew	Released: October 1993; Label: Regular (D 11609)
The Single Suitcase	Released:1996; Label: TWA Records (TWAS016)
