= Creatures of Leisure =

Studio album by Mental As Anything
- Released: March 1983
- Recorded: Albert Studios, Sydney, Australia
- Genre: Pop
- Length: 39:24
- Label: Regular Records
- Producer: Russell Dunlop & Bruce Brown (2 tracks on international version produced by Mark Moffatt & Ricky Fataar)

Mental As Anything chronology
Cats and Dogs (1981)	Creatures of Leisure (1983)	Fundamental (1985)

Singles from Creatures of Leisure
- 1. "Close Again" Released: November 1982; 2. "Spirit Got Lost" Released: March 1983; 3. "Brain Brain" Released: September 1983; 4. "Working for the Man" Released: November 1983

Professional ratings
Review scores
Source	Rating
Allmusic	4.5/5 stars

Creatures of Leisure is the fourth studio album released by Australian band, Mental As Anything. It was released in March 1983 and peaked at #8 on the Australian Album charts.

== Reception ==
AllMusic called it the Mentals' "best album to date" saying "it is a must have for pure pop fans, new wave fans, rock & roll fans, and Aussie rock fans" and noted similarities with Rockpile and Squeeze".

Rip It Up said "Album number four and the cracks are beginning to show, just a little. Not that this is a bad record. It's just that it gets the slightest bit dull and workmanlike. I'm afraid the title of the first track sums it up: 'Spirit Got Lost'."

Trouser Press said the album "reveals an overwhelmingly downcast band, singing wistful lyrics about romantic discord and a general lack of gumption. Even the music is depressed, playing in the same countryish style with barely a trace of enthusiasm. Without wallowing in self-pity or indulging in any overt declarations of misery, Creatures of Leisure is an enormously sad record."

== Track listing ==
=== Australian edition ===
Creatures of Leisure
No.	Title	Writer(s)	Length
1.	"Spirit Got Lost"	Reg Mombassa, Andrew 'Greedy' Smith	2:59
2.	"Float Away"	Reg Mombassa	2:43
3.	"Brain Brain"	Peter O'Doherty	4:37
4.	"Bitter to Swallow"	Andrew Smith	3:46
5.	"Close Again"	Peter O'Doherty	2:57
6.	"Space to Let"	Martin Plaza	2:47
7.	"Not Enough" (MC / CD only track not included on LP release)	Martin Plaza, Reg Mombassa	2:52
8.	"Drinking of Her Lips"	Reg Mombassa	3:28
9.	"Fiona"	Andrew Smith	3:28
10.	"Nothing's Going Right Today"	Martin Plaza	3:20
11.	"Red to Green"	Peter O'Doherty, Victoria Campbell	3:25
12.	"Country in the Concrete"	Reg Mombassa	3:25
13.	"Let's Not Get Sentimental" (Track timing includes unlisted track, below.)	Martin Plaza	6:49
14.	"Business & Pleasure" (Unlisted track. A new recording of a track originally heard on Get Wet.)	Martin Plaza

=== International Edition ===
The version of Creatures of Leisure released in North America dropped the tracks "Space to Let" and "Country in the Concrete", and added "Working for the Man" and "Seems Alright to Me". Additionally, "Nothing's Going Right Today" appeared in remixed form.

"Business & Pleasure", which was a completely unlisted track on the Australian release, was listed on the sleeve and on the label of the international edition, although it was not listed on the lyric sheet.

Creatures of Leisure
No.	Title	Writer(s)	Length
1.	"Spirit Got Lost"	Reg Mombassa, Andrew 'Greedy' Smith	2:56
2.	"Float Away"	Reg Mombassa	2:41
3.	"Brain Brain"	Peter O'Doherty	4:35
4.	"Bitter to Swallow"	Andrew Smith	3:43
5.	"Close Again"	Peter O'Doherty	2:54
6.	"Nothing's Going Right Today" (Remixed by Joe Raine)	Martin Plaza	3:15
7.	"Not Enough" (MC only track not included on LP release)	Martin Plaza, Reg Mombassa	2:52
8.	"Working for the Man"	Roy Orbison	3:31
9.	"Fiona"	Andrew Smith	3:25
10.	"Seems Alright to Me"	Martin Plaza	3:28
11.	"Drinking of Her Lips"	Reg Mombassa	2:50
12.	"Red to Green"	Peter O'Doherty, Victoria Campbell	3:27
13.	"Let's Not Get Sentimental"	Martin Plaza	4:30
14.	"Business & Pleasure"	Martin Plaza	2:20

== Personnel ==
=== Musicians ===
- Martin Plaza — lead vocals, guitar
- Greedy Smith — lead vocals, keyboards, harmonica
- Reg Mombassa — guitar, vocals
- Peter O'Doherty — bass, guitar, vocals
- Wayne de Lisle — drums

=== Recording details ===
- Bruce Brown — producer, engineer
- Russell Dunlop — producer, engineer
- David Hemming — assistant producer, assistant engineer
- Frank DeLuna — mastering

=== Additional credits on international edition ===
- Mark Moffatt — producer (tracks: 7 & 9)
- Ricky Fataar — producer (tracks: 7 & 9)
- Tim Kramer — engineer (tracks: 7 & 9)
- Joe Raine — remix (track 6)

=== Art work ===
- Martin Plaza — artwork
- Syd Shelton — cover design, photography
- Reg Mombassa — drawings
- Ken Smith — finished art
- Jon Watkins — finished art
- Melanie Nissen — finished art

== Charts ==
Chart (1983)	Peak position
Australian (Kent Music Report)	8
New Zealand Albums (RMNZ)	38

== Release history ==
Region	Date	Label	Format	Catalogue
Australia & New Zealand	March 1983	Regular Records	Vinyl LP	RRLP1205
Canada	1983	Solid Gold Records	Vinyl LP	SGR1018
United States	1983	A&M Records	Vinyl LP	SP4946
UK & Europe	1983	A&M Records	Vinyl LP	AMLH64946
Japan	1983	A&M Records	Vinyl LP	AMP28094
Australia	1998	Festival Records	CD	D20209
