= Beatfish =

Australian Band

- Origin: Sydney, Australia
- Genres: Dance
- Years active: 1990–1992
- Labels: RCA; BMG
- Past members: James Freud; Martin Plaza

Beatfish were a short-lived Australian dance duo consisting of James Freud and Martin Plaza.

== Discography ==
=== Albums ===
List of albums, with Australian chart positions
| Title | Album details | Peak chart positions |
| Title | Album details | AUS |
|---|---|---|
| Beatfish | Released: November 1991; Format: CD, Cassette; Label: RCA (VPCD 0842) | 79 |

=== Singles ===
| Year | Title | Chart positions | Album |
| Year | Title | AUS | Album |
|---|---|---|---|
| 1991 | "Wheels of Love" | 26 | Beatfish |
| 1991 | "All Around the World" | 58 | Beatfish |
| 1991 | "Out of Control (Round and Round)" | 110 | Beatfish |
| 1992 | "Get Together" | 159 | non-album single |
