= Working for the Man (song) =

1962 song by Roy Orbison

Single by Roy Orbison
- B-side: "Leah"
- Published: September 27, 1962 Acuff-Rose Publications, Inc.
- Released: September 8, 1962
- Recorded: August 14, 1962
- Studio: RCA Victor Studio B, Nashville, Tennessee
- Genre: Rock and roll
- Label: Monument; London
- Songwriter: Roy Orbison

Roy Orbison singles chronology
"The Crowd" (1962)	"Working for the Man" (1962)	"In Dreams" (1963)

"Working for the Man" is a song composed and sung by rock and roll performer Roy Orbison. Released in 1962 as a double A-side with "Leah", it reached number one in Australia, number thirty-three in the US, and the top 50 in Canada and England.

== Details ==
"Working for the Man" and "Leah" were both recorded on August 14, 1962. It was the first release after the dissolution of Orbison's writing partnership with Joe Melson. In many releases it was subtitled, "with Bob Moore's Orchestra and Chorus".

"Working for the Man" was inspired by Orbison's time after school. He said, "I was working for El Paso Natural Gas in the daytime, cutting up steel and loading it onto trucks and chopping weeds and painting water towers. Our straw boss was Mr. Rose, and he wouldn’t cut me any slack." Elsewhere he added, "I worked in the blazing heat, hard, hard labor, and then I’d play at night, come home and some nights be too tired to eat or even to undress. I’d lay down, and I wouldn’t even turn over. I’d wake up in the same spot and hit the oil patch again." He added, "Most of the songs I've written are based on experiences I recall. It may be some years after a thing has happened to me that I'll think about it and then write a song."

== Reception ==
At the time of release, Billboard noted "Working for the Man" was a "fine song" and "a smartly styled work song that reached a powerful climax". The BBC noted, "Orbison could be playful. The yodelling, gleeful "Working for the Man" is a double-edged paean to hard-nosed capitalism."

== Mental as Anything version ==
"Working for the Man"

Single by Mental As Anything
- B-side: "Seems Alright to Me (AUS); Red To Green (Canada)"
- Released: November 1983
- Genre: Pop, Rock
- Length: 3:31
- Label: Regular Records
- Songwriter: Roy Orbison
- Producers: Mark Moffatt, Ricky Fataar

Mental As Anything singles chronology
"Brain Brain" (1983)	"Working for the Man" (1983)	"Apocalypso (Wiping the Smile Off Santa's Face)" (1984)

Music video
- "Working For The Man" on YouTube

Australian band Mental as Anything released the song as a non-album single in November 1983. It peaked at number 20 in Australia and 49 in New Zealand. It was subsequently added to the North American version of Creatures of Leisure.

=== Track listings ===
Regular Records (RRSP 730
No.	Title	Writer(s)	Length
1.	"Working for the Man"	Roy Orbison	3:31
2.	"Seems Alright to Me"	Martin Plaza	3:29

=== Charts ===
Chart (1983/84)	Peak position
Australian (Kent Music Report)	20
New Zealand (Recorded Music NZ)	49
