= Greedy Smith =

Australian musician (1956–2019)

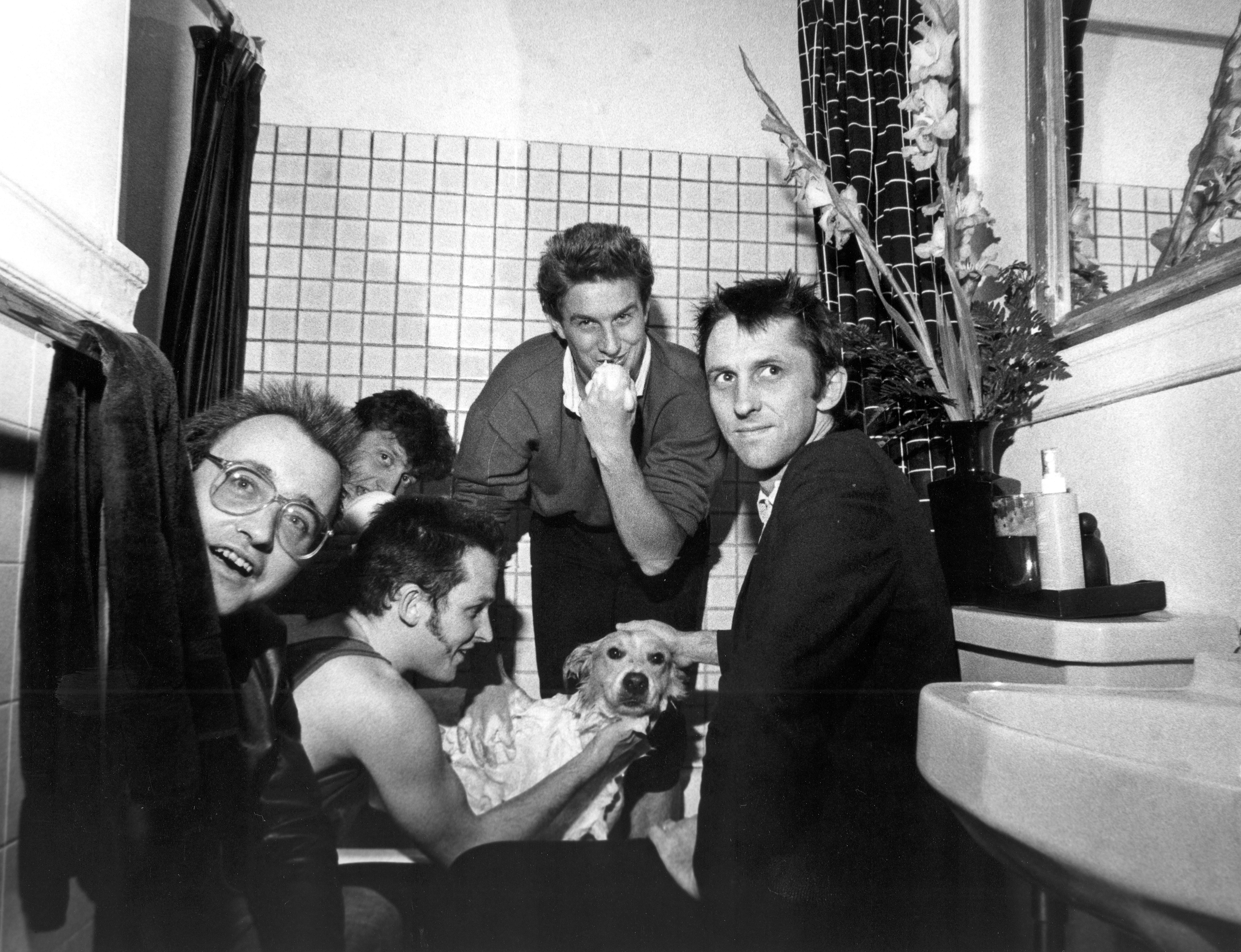
- Smith in 1983

Background information
- Also known as: Greedy
- Born: Andrew McArthur Smith; 16 January 1956; Sydney, New South Wales, Australia
- Died: 2 December 2019 (aged 63) Sydney, New South Wales, Australia
- Genres: New wave; rock
- Labels: Regular; WEA; CBS Records; TWA; Liberation; Warner Music
- Website: mentalasanything.com

Andrew McArthur "Greedy" Smith (16 January 1956 – 2 December 2019) was an Australian vocalist, keyboardist, harmonicist and songwriter with Australian pop/new wave band Mental As Anything. Smith wrote many of their hit songs including "Live It Up" which peaked at No. 2 on the Australian singles chart. Smith had a solo music career, had worked with other bands and was also an artist and television personality.

== Early life ==
Born Andrew McArthur Smith in Sydney, Australia, he later attended North Sydney Boys High. Showing an interest in art he moved on to the East Sydney Technical College (now known as the National Art School) in Darlinghurst in the mid-1970s while also holding down a part-time job as a bottle shop attendant. At college he met fellow students, Martin Murphy, Chris O'Doherty, David Twohill and Steve Coburn, whose band, Mental As Anything, had been playing at art school parties and dances since May 1976. While playing harmonica in another band at the time, Smith started appearing on stage with Mental As Anything from around December. He was eventually cajoled by fellow Mental As Anything members to learn keyboards on an old wedding reception organ to fill in their sound and he quit his other band. He was given the nickname "Greedy" after eating 15 pieces of chicken on stage one night.

== Art career ==
All early members of Mental As Anything are also artists and have exhibited their artworks since 1982. Although Smith was not as well known for his artwork as band member Reg Mombassa, of Mambo Graphics fame, his best known artwork is from his Storm Clouds Over the Piazza series that was exhibited at the Mentals III travelling art exhibition in 1997. These portraits are based on his legendary unfinished novel of the same name, a rambling WWII saga that he used to mention in interviews but is actually fictional in itself.

== Mental As Anything ==
Smith joined Mental As Anything in 1977, and in addition to playing keyboards and harmonica was one of the band's frontmen and songwriters. (Martin Plaza also frequently wrote and sang the band's material; Reg Mombassa and Peter O'Doherty also wrote for the band, and less frequently, sang.) Smith usually wrote and sang at least two songs on each of the band's albums, and was the writer and singer of the band's international hits "Too Many Times" (1982) and "Live It Up" (1985), as well as Australia-only hits like "You're So Strong" (1986) and "The World Seems Difficult" (1990).

The four other original members of the band quit, left or stopped touring with Mental As Anything in the 2000s, and were replaced by new recruits. By about 2016, Smith was the only original band member left still touring with Mental As Anything, and he continued to tour with the band until his death.

== Solo and side projects ==
In 1982, Smith played with Twohill in a group called the Space Shuttle Ramblers that recorded an EP; however, the tapes were destroyed in a studio flood prior to their never-realized planned commercial release. In 1992, during the Mental As Anything sabbatical, he formed a side group called Greedy's on the Loose that played gigs and recorded, but no product was released. In 1996 he recorded a solo album, Love Harmonica, for TWA at Jim Blackfoots Audioscapes Studio. This led to live work with a band dubbed Greedy's People and the re-recording in full band mode and subsequent re-release of the album. This new version of the album, also on TWA, was retitled Greedy's People and included a bonus recording of the Carpenters' "Close to You". Rock historian Ian McFarlane described Love Harmonica as an album of "easy-listening love songs that featured latin, pop and jazz rhythms with lush harmonica as the lead instrument."

== Media work ==
As the most gregarious member of Mental As Anything, in the early days he was often relied upon to give interviews for TV, radio and press. This led to further media opportunities such as hosting episodes and segments of the music shows Countdown, including the associated Countdown Awards, and Sounds. In the late 1980s he was often a judge on the "Red Faces" segment of Hey Hey It's Saturday and in the early 1990s he hosted Tonight Live With Steve Vizard for a week in the absence of the regular host. He also appeared regularly on the music quiz show Spicks and Specks.

== Death ==
On 3 December 2019 it was announced, via the band's website, that Smith had died a day earlier: "It is with an incredibly heavy heart to announce that one of the founding members of Mental As Anything, Andrew Greedy Smith, passed away from a heart attack."

In an interview recorded on 30 October 2019 (five weeks before Smith's death) with Alan Gilmour, from the Australian Songwriters Association, to honour him and Martin Plaza as the 2019 Australian Songwriters Hall of Fame Inductees, Smith stated "To have lived this long is a great thing." He was survived by his girlfriend, Fiona Docker, and his son, Harvey-Hutchings Smith.

== Awards ==
=== Australian Songwriters Hall of Fame ===
The Australian Songwriters Hall of Fame was established in 2004 to honour the lifetime achievements of some of Australia's greatest songwriters.

Year	Nominee / work	Award	Result
2019	himself	Australian Songwriters Hall of Fame	inducted

=== Countdown Australian Music Awards ===
Countdown was an Australian pop music TV series on national broadcaster ABC-TV from 1974 to 1987, it presented music awards from 1979 to 1987, initially in conjunction with magazine TV Week. The TV Week / Countdown Awards were a combination of popular-voted and peer-voted awards.

Year	Nominee / work	Award	Result
1985	himself	Best Songwriter	Won

== Discography ==
=== Solo ===
Featured on "Baby You're One Long Kick In The Head" from The Field Brothers' 2016 album "Every Day is Like An Elvis Movie!"

==== Albums ====
- Love Harmonica – TWA (September 1996)

==== Singles ====
- "Time Heals All Wounds" – TWA (September 1996)
- "Always Thinking of You" – TWA (February 1997)

=== Greedy's People ===
- Greedy's People – TWA (1997)
