= Mental As Anything =

Australian new wave/pop-rock band

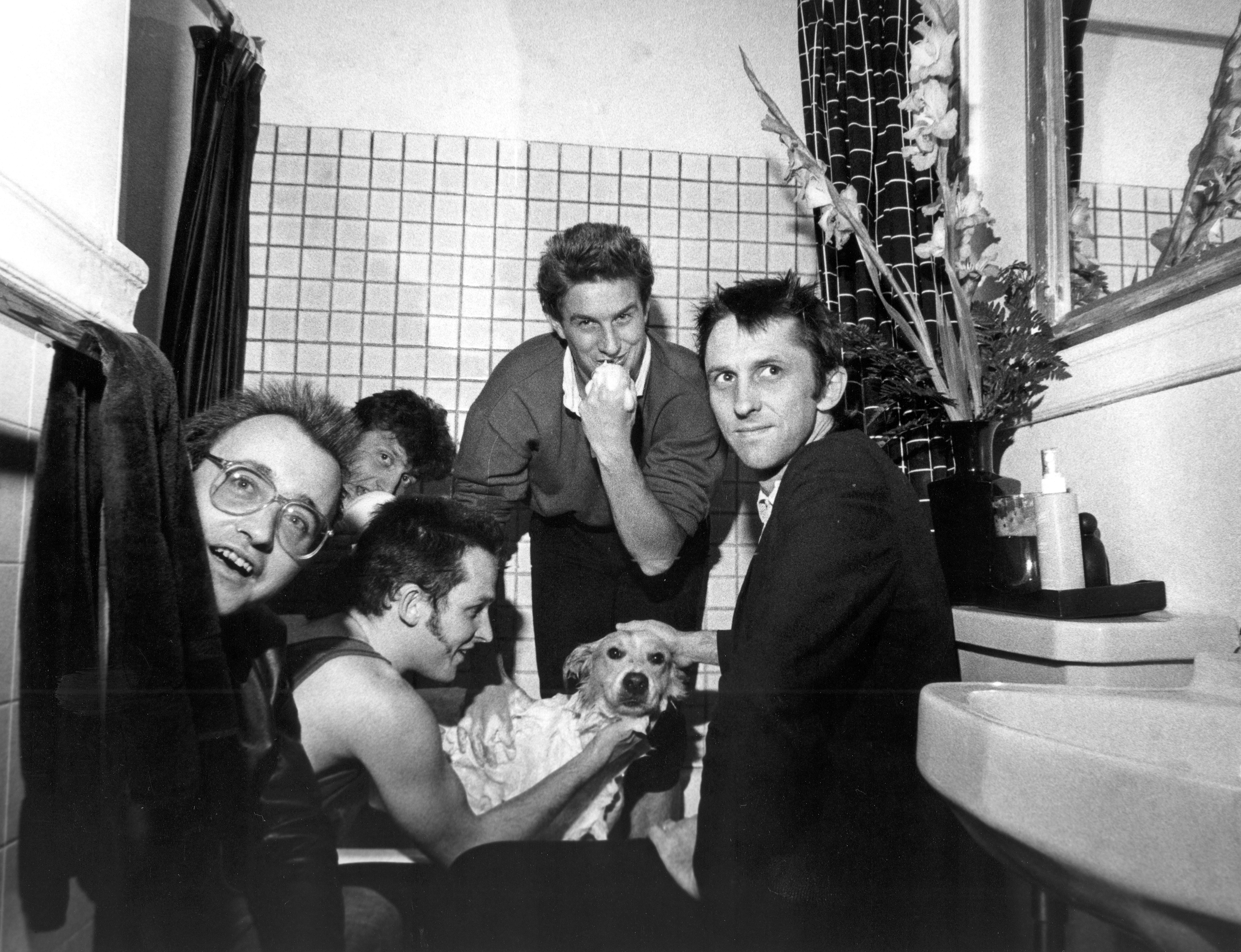
- Mental As Anything in a 1983 publicity shot

Background information
- Also known as: The Death Barrels
- Origin: Sydney, New South Wales, Australia
- Genres: New wave, pop, rock
- Years active: 1976–2019, 2025–present
- Labels: Regular/Festival, Liberation, WEA/Warner, CBS, BMG
- Spinoffs: X-Mentals
- Members: Reg Mombassa; Peter O'Doherty; Simon Rudston-Brown; Shannon Stitt; Declan O’Doherty
- Past members: Martin Plaza; Greedy Smith; Jacob Cook; Martin Cilia; Craig Gordon; Peter Gray; Steve Coburn; Wayne DeLisle; David Barraclough; Murray Cook; Mike Caen; Robbie Souter; Zoltan Budai; James Gillard
- Website: mentalasanything.com

Mental As Anything are an Australian new wave and pop rock band that formed in Sydney in 1976. Its most popular line-up (which lasted from 1977 to 1999, and recorded all of its charting singles and albums) was Martin Plaza (birth name Martin Murphy) on vocals and guitar; Reg Mombassa (birth name Christopher O'Doherty) on lead guitar and vocals; his brother Peter "Yoga Dog" O'Doherty on bass guitar and vocals; Wayne de Lisle (birth name David Twohill) on drums; and Andrew "Greedy" Smith on vocals, keyboards and harmonica. The group's original hit songs were generated by Mombassa, O'Doherty, Plaza and Smith, either individually or collectively; and it also had success on the Australian charts with covers of songs by Roy Orbison, Elvis Presley, Chuck Berry and Wreckless Eric.

Their top ten Australian singles are "If You Leave Me, Can I Come Too?" and "Too Many Times" (both from 1981), "Live It Up" (1985) and "Rock and Roll Music" (1988). Internationally, "Too Many Times" made the Canadian top 40 in 1982, and "Live It Up" peaked at No. 3 in the UK, No. 4 in Norway, and No. 6 in Germany, after it featured in the 1986 Australian film Crocodile Dundee.

All of the early members are visual artists and had combined studio displays, some had solo studio displays, with Mombassa's artwork also used as designs by the Mambo clothing company. The majority of the group's record covers, posters and video clips were designed and created by the band members or their art school contemporaries. On 27 August 2009, Mental As Anything was inducted into the Australian Recording Industry Association (ARIA) Hall of Fame alongside Kev Carmody, The Dingoes, Little Pattie and John Paul Young. Most of the original group members left during the 2000s, and Andrew "Greedy" Smith—the only original band member still touring with Mental As Anything—died on 2 December 2019, aged 63, after a heart attack. This effectively ended the band's activies at that time, and Mental As Anything was neither a recording or performing unit from the end of 2019 to late 2025. However, various surviving group members from the classic 1977-2000 era participated in interviews for a book-length study of the group and an upcoming film documentary.

Reg Mombassa and Peter O'Doherty (who had both left the group in 2000) reformed Mental As Anything as of late 2025. The revived group played a free warm-up gig in December 2025, the appeared at the St Kilda Music Festival on Sunday 15 February 2026.They will embark on a 50th Anniversary Tour beginning in April 2026 at Byron Bay Blues Festival. Mombassa and O'Doherty are the only original group members in this reformation, although original drummer David Twohill is expected to make a few selected guest appearances.

== Style ==
Mental As Anything's music is characterised by poppy, accessible and well-crafted melodies and lyrics, and their work showcases an ironic, satirical and self-deprecating sense of humour. They are a typically "Australian" rock group, with their music and their satirical, good-time image deeply rooted in the milieu of Australian suburbia, although two key members (the O'Doherty brothers) were in fact immigrants from New Zealand. The group's art school background and visual design skills also made them pioneers of the music video form in Australia in the late 1970s and early 1980s, and their videos rank as some of the funniest and most imaginative produced in Australia at that time.

== History ==
=== 1976–1979: Formation and early years ===
The group formed at an art school in Sydney in 1976 when Martin Murphy (Martin Plaza) met fellow student, New Zealand-born Chris O'Doherty (Reg Mombassa) at Alexander Mackie College at East Sydney Technical College, now known as the National Art School. The duo was soon jamming in guitarist and vocalist O'Doherty's Darlinghurst flat. Murphy, on guitar and vocals, brought in his college friend Steve Coburn (son of artist, John Coburn) on bass guitar, while another student, David Twohill (Wayne de Lisle), was recruited on drums.

They were first billed as Mental as Anything on 14 May 1976, after some early party appearances without a name. Prior to the gig at a Chippendale Settlement Dance, they provided the promoter, Paul Worstead, with a list of possible names. Worstead chose Mental As Anything—which was how fellow artist Ken Bolton described them after one of their earlier party performances—and designed an accompanying poster featuring an image of a truck hauling a giant cabbage. The phrase "mental as anything" is late 1970s Australian slang for being crazy, outlandish, having extreme fun, or 'going off'.

Late in 1976, another fellow East Sydney Tech student, Andrew Smith (Greedy Smith) made guest appearances with the band on harmonica while still a member of another band, and by year's end Smith had joined full-time and he also played keyboards. Coburn left the fledgling band in 1977 and Mombassa's younger brother Peter O'Doherty joined on bass guitar completing the "classic" line-up. The first performance of the new line-up was at the National Art School's Cell Block Theatre on 17 August, the day news broke in Australia of the death of Elvis Presley. They played numerous Elvis covers and two original songs, together with their usual set of Blues, Rockabilly, Country and 1960s covers including Roy Orbison and The Monkees. The band built up a live following in Sydney with their residencies at the Unicorn Hotel in inner-city Paddington on Mondays and the Civic Hotel in the CBD on Thursdays. At the Unicorn Hotel, their stage was on top of the pool table to free up floor space.

The band was spotted by film-makers Cameron Allen and Martin Fabinyi, who founded their own independent record label, Regular Records, in September 1978 to record and release the group's music. Fabinyi's brother Jeremy Fabinyi became Mental As Anything's manager. Their debut release was a three-track EP, Mental As Anything Plays at Your Party, in December. It featured all original tracks, and is their only release on which Plaza and Mombassa were credited by their original names, Martin Murphy and Chris O'Doherty, respectively. Sydney radio station Double Jay (now Triple J), gave airplay to its most popular track, "The Nips Are Getting Bigger", a drinking song written by Plaza, which showed a stylistic debt to British new wave. Soon after the EP's release, the Australian arm of Festival Records took over distribution of Regular Records and released a remix of "The Nips Are Getting Bigger" as a single in July 1979. This was followed on 1 November by the band's debut album, Get Wet, with Allen producing. With support from nationwide TV pop show Countdown, "The Nips Are Getting Bigger" became the group's first Australian Kent Music Report top 20 hit, and also made No. 1 on the UK alternative charts when released there by Virgin Records and remains one of the group's most popular songs. Get Wet achieved a top 20 position on the Kent Music Report albums chart.

By the time of the LP's release in November, all but Peter O'Doherty had adopted a pseudonym: Chris O'Doherty became Reg Mombassa; Murphy became Martin Plaza—his name copied from the title of the pedestrian plaza in central Sydney, also known as Martin Place; Smith's voracious appetite saw him dubbed "Greedy"; and Twohill became Wayne "Bird" Delisle. (Starting in 1995, Twohill was later billed under his birth name). Shortly before the names had been settled, Peter O'Doherty was using the pseudonym Ouzo Pork, but he elected to keep his birth name for professional purposes. His nickname, as used in interviews, was Yoga Dog, but he was never billed as such. The band completed their first national tour in late 1979, supporting British rockers Rockpile, with members Dave Edmunds and Nick Lowe.

=== 1980–1984: Success in Australia ===
Mental As Anything's next two singles—Plaza's "Possible Theme for a Future TV Drama Series" (November 1979) and Mombassa's "Egypt" (January 1980)—did not reach the top 50. Their second LP, Espresso Bongo, released in July, was named after the Cliff Richard movie, and it peaked into the top 40. Their fourth single, "Come Around", returned them to the top 20 in June, and it was followed by a top 30 hit with "(Just Like) Romeo and Juliet", an upbeat cover of the 1964 hit by The Reflections, as a non-album single in November 1980.

They scored a No. 4 national hit with Plaza's "If You Leave Me Can I Come Too?", released in May 1981. Smith penned the follow-up, "Too Many Times", which became a No. 6 hit. It was accompanied by a music video shot on a building block in a Sydney seaside suburb and brought Mental As Anything international exposure by becoming a top 40 hit in Canada in July 1982, when they toured North America in support of Men at Work.

The next single, "Berserk Warriors" (December 1981), was a satirical tribute to ABBA, although the concurrent release of the pop hit "Swords of a Thousand Men" by British band Tenpole Tudor prevented Mental As Anything from realising their plan to make a Viking-themed music video to promote it, although they did eventually make the clip as planned and included it on their subsequent video album compilation. All of the 1981 singles were included on their Bruce Brown and Russell Dunlop produced Cats & Dogs, which became their biggest success to date, reaching No. 3 nationally. Mombassa's "Let's Cook" (April 1982) was a radio-only single. "Let's Cook" was also an MTV Video. Mental As Anything members were also visual artists and held their first exhibition of their works in May. In June, during his tour of Australia, Elvis Costello heard them and produced their next single "I Didn't Mean to Be Mean" (August 1982), written by Plaza.

A compilation album, If You Leave Me, was released in September 1982 in the United States and Men at Work, then at the peak of their popularity, had included Mental As Anything as a support act on their US tour. Peter O'Doherty wrote the band's next single, the sentimental "Close Again" (November), from their fourth album, Creatures of Leisure, released in April 1983 and produced by Brown and Dunlop, which peaked at No. 8. It provided two more singles, the Smith and Mombassa collaboration "Spirit Got Lost" (March), which was accompanied by an imaginative animated video clip, and Pete O'Doherty's "Brain Brain" (September). To promote, "Spirit Got Lost", Mental As Anything performed the single on Countdown with the episode's director, Kris Noble, using a dry ice-filled coffin with a band member due to emerge; complaints from within the coffin were ignored by Noble with "It's only another 30 seconds", until a crew member remembered that dry ice could cause nausea, choking or even death.

Their final 1983 single was a cover of Roy Orbison's "Working for the Man" (November), produced by Mark Moffatt and Ricky Fataar. Internationally, Creatures of Leisure was altered to drop three Australia-only tracks and replace them with both sides of the "Working for the Man" single.

It was another year before their next single, Mombassa and Plaza's blackly humorous Christmas release, "Apocalypso (Wiping the Smile off Santa's Face)" appeared in December 1984, which was one of the first Australian recordings to be remixed as a 12" 'disco' version. The innovative stop-motion video by B Sharp Productions to promote "Apocalypso" later shared the "Best Promotional Video" award—with INXS' "Burn for You" by Richard Lowenstein—at the 1984 Countdown Awards held in 1985.

=== 1985–1989: International success ===
Greedy Smith began to gain prominence with his songwriting success and became the lead vocalist on several songs. Plaza's deep, sultry vocals contrasted well with Smith's higher pitched pop and falsetto. Smith penned and sang the next two singles, both from their Fundamental album produced by Richard Gottehrer and released in September 1985, which peaked at No. 3. "You're So Strong" (March 1985) reached No. 11 in Australia and also charted in the top 30 of the US Billboard Hot Dance Club Songs chart. It was followed by the band's biggest Australian hit "Live It Up" (May 1985) which climbed to No. 2 and remained there for three weeks behind Madonna's "Angel / Into the Groove". The single also reached No. 3 in the UK in 1987, and was a hit in Europe, after being included in the soundtrack of the hugely successful Australian 1986 film Crocodile Dundee.

The band performed three songs in the 1985 Oz for Africa concert (part of the global Live Aid program) – "Live It Up", "If You Leave Me, Can I Come Too? " and "You're So Strong". It was broadcast both in Australia and on MTV in the US. Smith's "Date With Destiny" (September 1985) peaked into the top 30 but Plaza's "Big Wheel" (November 1985) did not reach the top 50. In December 1986, they performed under the pseudonym, The Death Barrels, in a competition sponsored by Mambo, Battle of the Surf Bands at Selina's Coogee Bay Hotel.

1986 saw the release of "Greatest Hits Volume 1" which reached number 2 on the Australian charts. "Sloppy Croc", an instrumental that featured on the Crocodile Dundee Soundtrack alongside "Live It Up", was released as a single in Australia but with little promotion, failed to chart.

From late in 1986 to early 1987, Mental As Anything were the opening act on the multi-group Australian Made concert tour where they were joined by former Dynamic Hepnotics keyboardist Mike Gubb. The tour started with claims of mateship and cooperation; however arguments ensued between various band managers over the proposed concert series film. At the Sydney concert, Peter Trotter, playing trombone for Mental As Anything, collapsed on stage and died a week later. The tour ended in acrimony with two managers, Chris Murphy (for INXS) and Jeremy Fabinyi (for Mental As Anything), arguing backstage in Sydney and coming to blows. A film of the tour, Australian Made: The Movie, directed by Richard Lowenstein, was released in July 1987, but contained no footage of Mental As Anything performing. They followed the Australian Made tour by extensive touring of Europe and the UK on the back of the success of "Live It Up" and to promote their album of that year Mouth to Mouth, again produced by Gottehrer

Mouth to Mouth charted in the top 20 in Australia and the two singles lifted from it, "He's Just No Good For You" and "Don't Tell Me Now" both charted in the Top 40, as did a further single at years end, a cover of Elvis Presley's "Love Me Tender". The music video for "He's Just No Good for You" was filmed on Scarborough Street in Monterey, New South Wales.

In late 1988, a cover of the Chuck Berry chestnut "Rock and Roll Music"—recorded for the Yahoo Serious movie Young Einstein—went top 5 on the Australian Recording Industry Association (ARIA) Singles Charts. The single appeared on their next album, Cyclone Raymond, produced by Steve James, Mark Moffatt, Mark Opitz and Robyn Smith; which peaked into the top 40 ARIA Albums Charts in October 1989. A planned first single for 1989, "Love Comes Running" was cancelled from release in Australia, instead appearing in New Zealand only. The first single released in 1989 from the album, "The World Seems Difficult" was a top twenty hit, but polished up for the overseas market, sounded unlike anything the band had previously released. Two further singles, "Baby You're Wild" and "Overwhelmed" did not peak into the top 50, and promotion of the album was hindered after Smith injured his arm in a horse riding accident, and was hospitalised, which forced tour concerts to be postponed or cancelled. By early 1990, Mental As Anything members agreed to take a sabbatical to work on solo work and side projects. Then Deputy Prime Minister, Paul Keating, opened their second group studio art exhibition in 1990.

=== 1990–1993: Side projects and sabbatical ===
In 1986 Plaza released a solo single, a cover of the 1960s Unit 4 + 2 song "Concrete and Clay", which was a No. 2 hit; the subsequent solo album, Plaza Suite, also charted. In 1991, during his sabbatical from Mental As Anything, Plaza collaborated with former member of Models, James Freud. As Beatfish, they released the self-titled album, Beatfish, which was one of the first Australian dance or house flavoured albums. Plaza's 1994 album Andy's Chest was composed almost entirely of Lou Reed covers. Another collaboration with Freud occurred in 1996 and resulted in the Hawaiian inspired Moondog project, with Plaza appearing on some tracks of the album Postcard from Hawaii.

Mombassa and O'Doherty formed the duo Reg & Peter/Peter & Reg (they alternated names whenever interviewed) and released a single, "Jean" in March 1991, before adopting the band name Dog Trumpet and releasing the album Two Heads One Brain. Studio musicians were Mike Gubb on keyboards (ex-Dynamic Hepnotics, Mental as Anything), John Bliss on drums (ex-The Reels) and Mark Honeybrook on bass guitar. Further releases followed with the EPs Kiss a Gun Down in October 1992 and Strange Brew in October 1993. After returning to Mental As Anything, they continued with their Dog Trumpet side project and provided three further album releases.

Mombassa also designed innumerable T-shirts, posters, videos and record covers for Mental As Anything and other bands. His most recent album cover is for Public Image Limited's "Greatest Hits So Far". Johnny Lydon spied Reg's work on Mambo clothing and sought him out to do their album cover. Reg's talents extend to illustrations and writings for, among others, Rolling Stone, Stiletto, RAM, Dolly and FMG.

Smith performed with his band, Greedy's on the Loose, during 1992 but there was no recorded output, while Twohill returned to art college and finished his degree. Around this time he dropped the "Wayne DeLisle" pseudonym, and was billed as David Twohill from the mid-90s forward.

=== 1993–1999: Return from sabbatical ===
During the sabbatical, Mental As Anything still played short tours and one-off gigs, but by 1993 they were back on record, providing the song "Ride", produced by Tim Farriss, for the soundtrack to the Yahoo Serious film Reckless Kelly. They released a compilation of rare album tracks and b-sides, Chemical Travel, in November.

By mid-1994 the band had recorded an album's worth of self-produced material but were having difficulty getting a release deal. They self-released an EP of songs, Bicycle, and gave it away on their summer 1994/95 tour of NSW and Queensland. Radio station Triple J received a copy of the Bicycle EP on Christmas Day 1994 and put the lead track "Mr Natural" on immediate heavy rotation. Other stations followed and the demand led to the track being given a commercial release as a single and reaching the top 30 on the ARIA Charts (although charting higher in the States where the tour and free EP didn't reach). The resulting album, 1995's Liar, Liar Pants on Fire, reached the top 40, with Mombassa's cover taking the 'Best Cover Art' award at the 1996 ARIA Music Awards.

Three further singles were lifted off Liar Liar in 1995 and 1996: Mombassa's "Nigel" which just failed to chart, a cover of Wreckless Eric's "Whole Wide World" which landed just out of the Top 50 (Top 30 in Victoria) and O'Doherty's tribute to Ms Faithful, "Marianne", which was released as the band supported Chris Isaak on his 1996 tour of Australia.

On 16 August 1997, Mental As Anything celebrated 20 years together with the same line-up with a free birthday show at the Hopetoun Hotel in Surry Hills, Sydney. Late 1997 saw the band put together their third group art exhibition, Mentals III, which was opened by former Prime Minister, Gough Whitlam, at the Manly Art Gallery (Paul Keating had opened their second group exhibition in 1990). Their 21st anniversary in 1998 was marked with the release of the last album by this line-up, Garàge, which did not reach the top 50, nor did the two singles lifted from it, "Just My Luck" and "Calling Colin". December 1999 saw the release of Best of Mental As Anything which was accredited by ARIA with a gold certificate by 2001, and a seasonal single "White Christmas", that was given away at their "Yule Party" gig at Sydney's Metro Theatre.

=== 2000–2019: Line-up changes ===
In April 2000, Mental As Anything announced the first official change to their line-up since 1977. Brothers Peter O'Doherty and Reg Mombassa left to pursue their own musical projects, including their band Dog Trumpet, and their art careers. The last tour by this line-up was a short trip to Vietnam organised by the Australian Government. They were replaced by David 'Duck' Barraclough (ex-The Exponents) and Murray Cook (ex-Leah Purcell, Mixed Relations). Cook (no relation to Murray Cook of The Wiggles) left the band after the Beetroot Stains album (2000) and was replaced by New Zealand born Mike Caen, who had worked with Jenny Morris, Margaret Urlich, Rick Price, Daryl Braithwaite and Tina Arena. At the Gimme Ted benefit concert on 10 March 2001, Mental As Anything performed three songs. The Road Case album by this line-up appeared late in 2002.

In 2003 the band started recording favourite covers that had inspired the band in its early days, including songs such as "Ruby, Don't Take Your Love to Town", "Lonesome Train", "Hangin Five", with a view to releasing an album under the title Songs the Lord Tortoise. Although the album was completed in 2004 it has not been released.

The next line-up change occurred in September 2004 when Twohill was sacked from the band by Plaza and Smith. Upon return to Sydney following a tour of Western Australia by the band Twohill was told at the airport that he had played his last show for the band. Twohill lodged a wrongful dismissal case against his former bandmates with the NSW Industrial Relations Commission in 2007. At the hearing, he said he had "no inkling" that his bandmates were dissatisfied with his performances and his attitude, whereas Plaza advised that the band had been discussing Twohill's future for some time and had issued the drummer with a warning after alleged unprofessional behaviour during a gig at Ettalong, north of Sydney, in December 2003.

It was because I asked him to not smoke in the dressing room he took it out on us on stage … played like a chimpanzee on speed, it was terrible.

— Martin Plaza

This was not an undisputed claim; in evidence given earlier, the band's stage technician Darren Brain, said Twohill "played quite well". Twohill was ultimately successful in his claim, with Justice Frank Marks stating that the band gave "no basis" for the expulsion.

Twohill was replaced by Robbie Souter, a veteran of Dynamic Hepnotics, Slim Dusty band and other country and roots music combos. This line-up recorded the acoustic Plucked, released in November 2005. In 2007 they toured Papua New Guinea for the first time to play three gigs in the capital Port Moresby as part of "Australia Week".

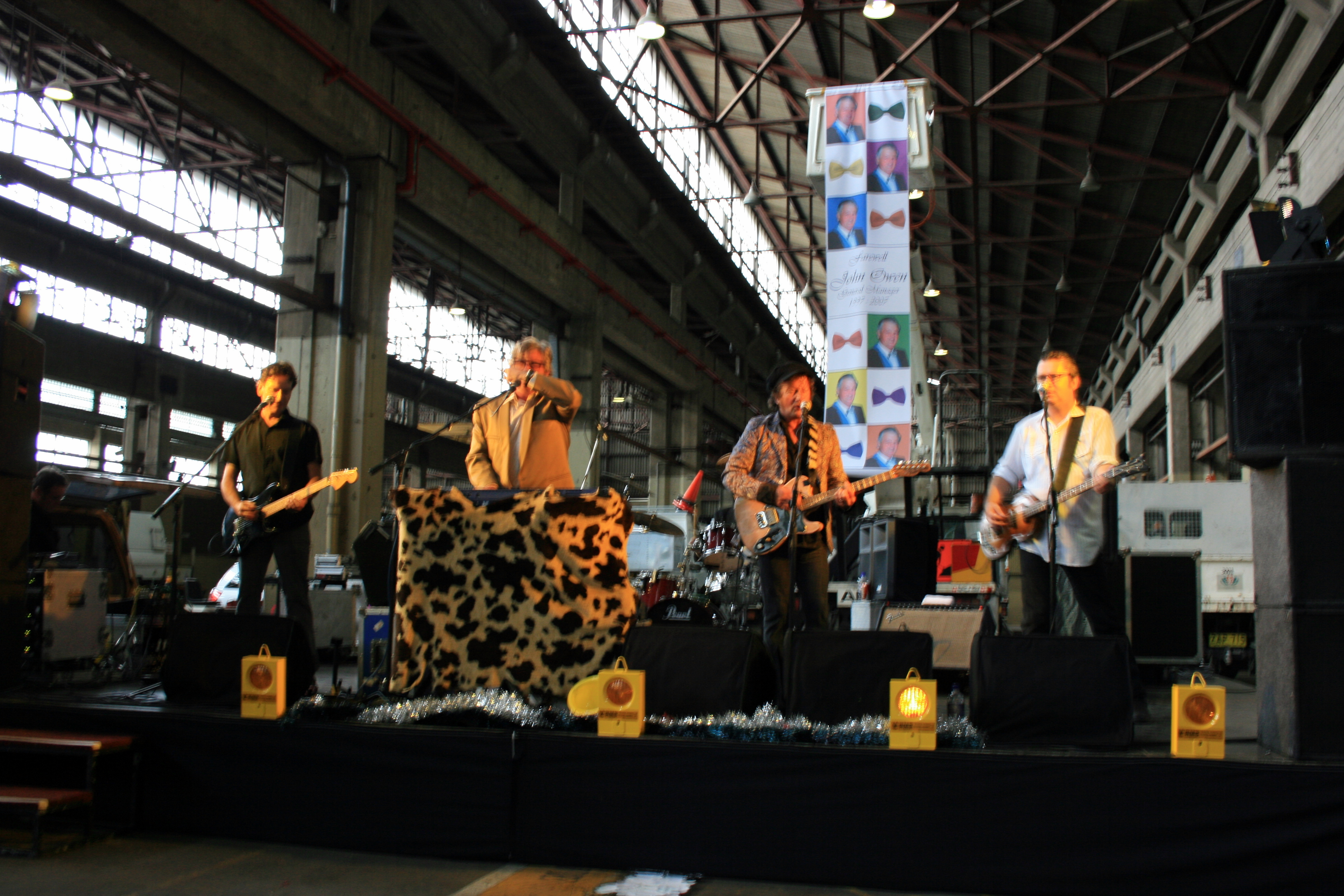
The band performing at Gore Hill, Sydney on 20 December 2007.

In May 2009 the band released the compilation album Essential as Anything, celebrating thirty years since the release of their first EP and national tour of their debut album. The album also included a DVD of all the video clips released by the band. Additionally Mental As Anything re-issued all ten of the band's albums as digital downloads. The band also released a new studio album, Tents Up, in June and toured nationally in support of both releases. On 27 August 2009, Mental As Anything was inducted into the Australian Recording Industry Association (ARIA) Hall of Fame alongside Kev Carmody, The Dingoes, Little Pattie and John Paul Young. Mombassa said that it was an honour to be inducted and thanked fans and industry supporters. At the ceremony they were inducted by Roy Slaven and they performed "Live It Up", "The Nips are Getting Bigger" and "If You Leave Me Can I Come Too" with Mombassa and O'Doherty rejoining them onstage.

On 18 September 2009 the band appeared live in Sydney's Apple Store with a digital download EP in the "iTunes Live from Sydney: Aussie Legends" series appearing the next day. An extensive pictorial biography of Mombassa, titled the "Mind of Times of Reg Mombassa" appeared in November, and by virtue of the subject served as a de facto biography of Mental As Anything up to Mombassa's departure in 2000. The Summer of 2009/2010 saw a national tour for the current line-up supporting the B-52s and Proclaimers. In 2010, children's entertainers The Wiggles, released their "Let's Eat" album with the lead track being a collaboration with Smith, Plaza, Mombassa and O'Doherty on a re-recording of "Let's Cook".

The band continued to tour regularly, playing smaller venues throughout Australia's cities and regional centres. In 2012 both Barraclough and Souter departed the band due to ill health; and were replaced by Zoltan Budai and Jacob Cook, respectively. Souter died in 2017 due to liver failure, aged 68, and Barraclough died in 2018 due to pancreatic cancer, aged 58. Further changes occurred when Caen departed in late 2013 and was replaced by Martin Cilia in early 2014; and when Budai departed the band in 2015 and was replaced by James Gillard.

Martin Plaza has been battling kidney cancer since 2013 and has had extended periods off the road, with Caen and Craig Gordon variously standing in. Plaza played with the Mentals throughout 2014, and for a few dates in October 2016, but his health forced him to thereafter permanently retire from the group's touring schedule.

During this time, the band released newly recorded material: Smith's "Shake Off Your Sandals" (2015), Plaza's "Goat Tracks in My Sandpit" (2016) and a 5 track EP called 5 Track EP (2017) which collected these two songs and three others. The EP was timed for release for the band's appearance on the 2017 APIA Good Times tour. Additionally back catalogue was reissued both physically and digitally in the UK/Europe via Demon/Edsel and in Australia via Universal Music Group.

Mental As Anything, now consisting of Greedy Smith (vocals/keyboards), Martin Cilia (guitars), Jacob Cook (drums), Craig Gordon (vocals/guitars) and Peter Gray (vocals/bass), played a special 40th anniversary show at Surfersaurus in Sydney, during October 2018. Smith was by this point the only original member of Mental As Anything to still be playing with the group. The concert was released as the live CD At Play in early 2019.

Andrew "Greedy" Smith died of a heart attack on 2 December 2019, in Sydney. Smith's final show with the band took place on 30 November in Tathra, New South Wales. Though no formal announcement was made about the group's dissolution, Mental As Anything essentially ceased to be an entity at this point, and the remaining members went their separate ways.

=== 2023–present: Book, documentary & 50th anniversary tour ===
In 2023, journalist Stuart Lloyd wrote a book about the band, Started Out Just Drinking Beer: The Mental As Anything Story. The book focuses on the five members of the classic line-up, and Mombassa, O'Doherty and Twohill appeared at the book launch and at other related promotional events. In addition to being sold in both stores and online, copies of the book (autographed by Mombassa, O'Doherty, Twohill and Lloyd) are available for sale at various Dog Trumpet shows.

In 2024 it was announced a feature-length documentary on the band, to be broadcast in 2025, was in development. The feature documentary Live It Up: The Mental As Anything Story was released in cinemas in March 2026.

On 10 November 2025, Reg Mombassa and Peter O'Doherty announced that Mental As Anything would officially reform. A warm-up gig occurred in December 2025, and the group will embark on a 50th Anniversary Tour beginning in April 2026 at Byron Bay Blues Festival. Aside from Reg Mombassa (guitar, vocals) and Peter O'Doherty (bass, vocals), the other musicians in the revived Mental As Anything are all new to the group: Simon Rudston-Brown on guitar and vocals, Shannon Stitt on keyboard and vocals, and Declan O’Doherty (Peter's son) on drums and vocals. Original Mentals drummer David Twohill is expected to make guest appearances at certain shows.

== Personnel ==
=== Members ===
Current members

- Reg Mombassa (Chris O'Doherty) – guitar, vocals (1976–2000, 2025-)
- Peter O'Doherty – bass, vocals (1977–2000, 2025-)
- Simon Rudston-Brown – guitar, vocals (2025-)
- Shannon Stitt – keyboard, vocals (2025-)
- Declan O’Doherty – drums, vocals (2025-)
  - David Twohill a.k.a. "Wayne de Lisle" – drums (1976–2004, guest in 2026)

Past members

- Martin Plaza (Martin Murphy) – lead vocals, guitar (1976–2019; non-touring from 2015)
- Greedy Smith (Andrew Smith) – lead vocals, keyboards, harmonica (1976–2019; his death)
- Steve Coburn – bass (1976–1977)
- David Barraclough – bass, vocals, guitar, keyboards (2000–2012; died 2018)
- Murray Cook – guitar (2000–2002)
- Mike Caen – guitar, vocals (2002–2013)
- Robbie Souter – drums (2004–2012; died 2017)
- Zoltan Budai – bass (2012–2015)
- Jacob Cook – drums (2012–2019)
- Martin Cilia – guitar, vocals (2014–2019)
- Craig Gordon – guitar, vocals (2015–2019)
- James Gillard – bass (2015–2017)
- Peter Gray – bass, vocals (2017–2019)

Touring and session musicians

- Mike Gubb – keyboards (1986–1990)

=== Line-ups ===
1976	1976-1977	1977-2000	2000-2002
Martin Plaza – lead vocals, guitar; Steve Coburn – bass; David Twohill (billed as "Wayne de Lisle") – drums; Reg Mombassa – guitar, vocals	Martin Plaza – lead vocals, guitar; Steve Coburn – bass; David Twohill (billed as "Wayne de Lisle") – drums; Reg Mombassa – guitar, vocals; Greedy Smith – lead vocals, keyboards, harmonica	Martin Plaza – lead vocals, guitar; David Twohill (billed as "Wayne de Lisle" through 1993) – drums; Reg Mombassa – guitar, vocals; Greedy Smith – lead vocals, keyboards, harmonica; Peter O'Doherty – bass, vocals	Martin Plaza – lead vocals, guitar; David Twohill – drums; Greedy Smith – lead vocals, keyboards, harmonica; David Barraclough – bass, vocals, guitar, keyboards; Murray Cook – guitar
2002-2004	2004-2012	2012-2013	2014-2015
Martin Plaza – lead vocals, guitar; David Twohill – drums; Greedy Smith – lead vocals, keyboards, harmonica; David Barraclough – bass, vocals, guitar, keyboards; Mike Caen – guitar, vocals	Martin Plaza – lead vocals, guitar; Greedy Smith – lead vocals, keyboards, harmonica; David Barraclough – bass, vocals, guitar, keyboards; Mike Caen – guitar, vocals; Robbie Souter – drums	Martin Plaza – lead vocals, guitar; Greedy Smith – lead vocals, keyboards, harmonica; Mike Caen – guitar, vocals; Zoltan Budai – bass; Jacob Cook – drums	Martin Plaza – lead vocals, guitar; Greedy Smith – lead vocals, keyboards, harmonica; Zoltan Budai – bass; Jacob Cook – drums; Martin Cilia – guitar, vocals
2015–2017	2017–2019	2020–2024	2025–present
Greedy Smith – lead vocals, keyboards, harmonica; Jacob Cook – drums; Martin Cilia – guitar, vocals; James Gillard – bass; Craig Gordon – guitar, vocals; Martin Plaza – lead vocals, guitar (for studio recordings—live performances in Oct. 2016 only)	Greedy Smith – lead vocals, keyboards, harmonica; Jacob Cook – drums; Martin Cilia – guitar, vocals; Craig Gordon – guitar, vocals; Peter Gray – bass, vocals	Group disbanded	Reg Mombassa – guitar, vocals; Peter O'Doherty – bass, vocals; Simon Rudston-Brown – guitar, vocals; Shannon Stitt – keyboard, vocals; Declan O’Doherty – drums, vocals; David Twohill – drums (guest at selected shows)

== Discography ==
- Get Wet (aka Mental As Anything) (1979)
- Espresso Bongo (1980)
- Cats & Dogs (aka If You Leave Me, Can I Come Too?) (1981)
- Creatures of Leisure (1983)
- Fundamental (1985)
- Mouth to Mouth (1987)
- Cyclone Raymond (1989)
- Liar Liar Pants on Fire (1995)
- Garàge (1998)
- Beetroot Stains (2000)
- Road Case (2002)
- Plucked (2005)
- Tents Up (2009)
- At Play (live album) (2019)

== Awards and honours ==
=== APRA Awards ===
These awards were established by Australasian Performing Right Association (APRA) in 1982 to honour the achievements of songwriters and music composers, and to recognise their songwriting skills, sales and airplay performance, by its members annually. Andrew "Greedy" Smith of Mental As Anything won the APRA Award for "Most Performed Australasian Popular Work" in 1987 for "Live It Up".

Year	Nominee / work	Award	Result
1987	"Live It Up" by Greedy Smith	Most Performed Australasian Popular Work	Won

=== ARIA Awards ===
Mental As Anything has won two Australian Recording Industry Association (ARIA) Awards including their 2009 induction into their Hall of Fame. This induction recognised their achievement of a "significant body of recorded work" and that they "had a cultural impact within Australia".

Year	Nominee / work	Award	Result
1995	"Mr Natural"	Best Pop Release	Nominated
1995	"Mr Natural" by Reg Mombassa	Best Cover Art	Nominated
1996	Liar Liar Pants on Fire by Reg Mombassa	Best Cover Art	Won
1999	Garàge by Reg Mombassa	Best Cover Art	Nominated
2009	Mental As Anything	Hall of Fame	inducted

=== Countdown Awards ===
Countdown was an Australian pop music TV series on national broadcaster ABC-TV from 1974 to 1987, it presented music awards from 1979 to 1987, initially in conjunction with magazine TV Week but then independently. TV Week had previously sponsored the 'King of Pop' awards. The Countdown Music and Video Awards were succeeded by the ARIA Awards.

Year	Nominee / work	Award	Result
1979	"The Nips Are Getting Bigger"	Best Single	Nominated
1979	Mental As Anything	Best New Talent	Nominated
1981	"If You Leave Me Can I Come Too?"	Best Single	Won
1981	Cats & Dogs	Best Album	Nominated
1981	Mental As Anything	Most Consistent Live Act	Nominated
1983	Creatures of Leisure	Best Album	Nominated
1983	"Spirit Got Lost"	Best Video	Nominated
1984	"Apocalypso"	Best Video	Won
1984	"Apocalypso"	Best Group Performance in a Video	Nominated
1985	Fundamental	Best Album	Won
1985	"Live It Up"	Best Single	Won
1985	Greedy Smith	Best Songwriter	Won
1985	"Live It Up"	Best Group Performance in a Video	Won
1986	"Let's Go To Paradise"	Best Group Performance in a Video	Nominated

=== Mo Awards ===
The Australian Entertainment Mo Awards (commonly known informally as the Mo Awards), were annual Australian entertainment industry awards. They recognise achievements in live entertainment in Australia from 1975 to 2016. Mental As Anything won one award in that time.

Year	Nominee / work	Award	Result (wins only)
2014	Mental As Anything	Best Rock Act of the Year	Won
