= Peter O'Doherty =

NZ-Australian musician (born 1958)

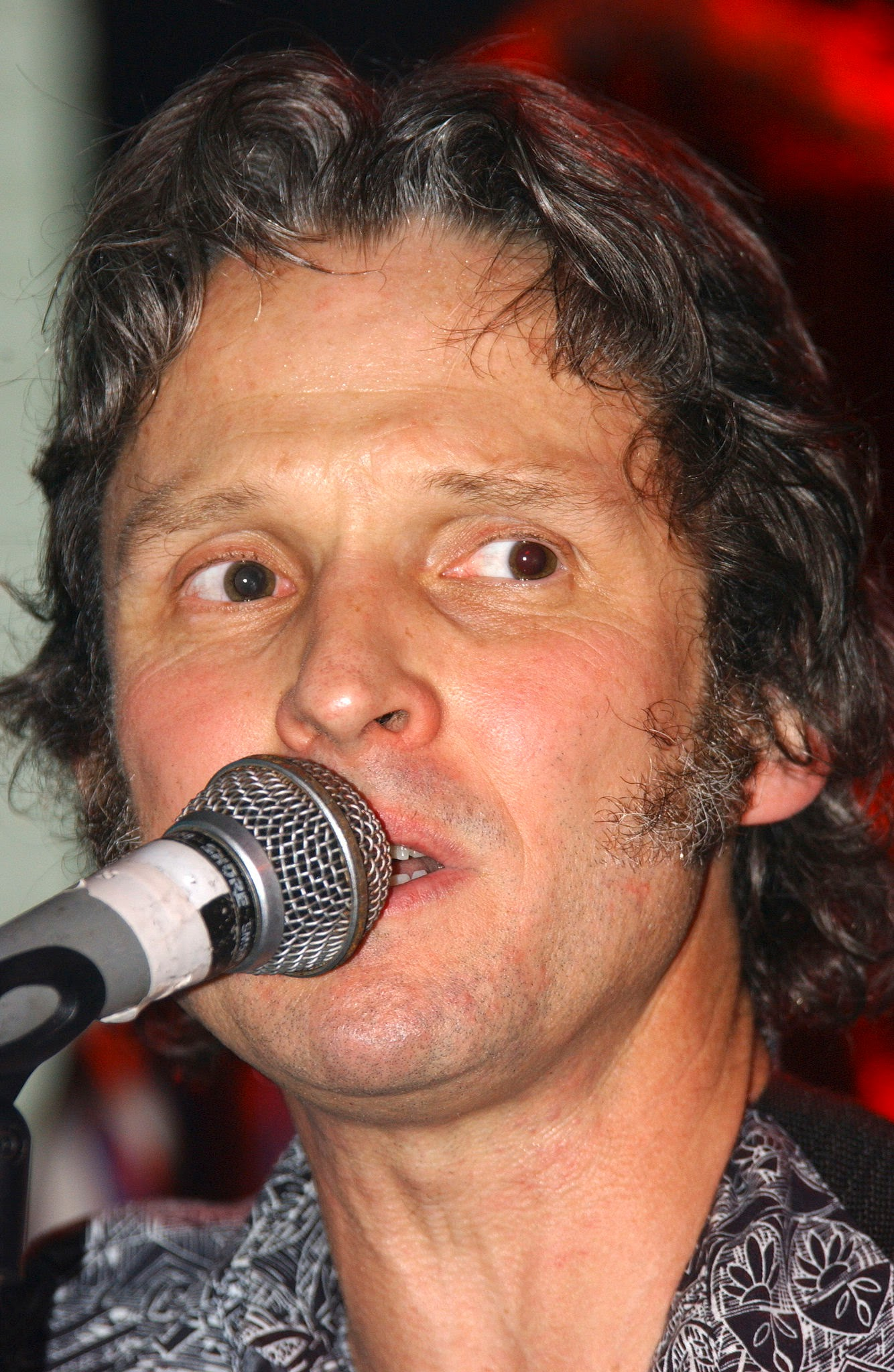
- Peter O'Doherty

Background information
- Also known as: Yoga Dog
- Born: 23 March 1958 (age 68); Auckland, New Zealand
- Origin: Sydney, New South Wales, Australia
- Genre: Pop
- Occupations: Musician; visual artist
- Instruments: Bass guitar; vocals; guitar
- Years active: 1977–present

Peter O'Doherty (born 23 March 1958) is a New Zealand-born Australian musician and visual artist. He is a founder of Australian pop band, Dog Trumpet, in 1991 on guitar and vocals, alongside his older brother, Chris O'Doherty (p.k.a. Reg Mombassa) on guitar, keyboards, harmonica and vocals. They were also members of new wave group, Mental as Anything, which O'Doherty joined in August 1977 on bass guitar and vocals, until they both left in 2000. As a visual artist, O'Doherty specialised in still life and everyday suburban scenes. His wife Susan, is also a visual artist.

== Early life to Mental as Anything ==
Peter O'Doherty was born in Auckland, New Zealand on 23 March 1958; with his family he emigrated to Sydney in 1969. His father, James, and mother were landscape painters. His older brother, Chris (p.k.a. Reg Mombassa, born 1951), attended art school where he formed a new wave group, Mental As Anything, in early 1976 with his fellow students. O'Doherty attended high school on Sydney's Northern Beaches, where he learnt classical guitar and later worked as a petrol station attendant. He appeared on stage with his brother's group in August 1977, initially filling in, and became a permanent member on bass guitar and vocals with Mombassa on lead guitar and vocals, Martin Plaza on vocals and guitar, Greedy Smith on vocals, keyboards and harmonica, and David Twohill on drums.

Unlike other members of the group's classic line-up, O'Doherty was billed under his real name on all their releases. (He was introduced as "Ouzo Pork" in a few early concerts, and acquired the occasionally-referenced nickname "Yoga Dog" later, but was always billed simply as Peter O'Doherty on all their records issued from 1978 through 1999.) During O'Doherty's time with the group they issued three Top 10 albums, Cats & Dogs (September 1981), Creatures of Leisure (March 1983) and Fundamental (September 1985). He also composed tracks, including the singles "Close Again" and "Brain Brain", provided guitar and designed covers and art work.

== Art career ==
Although O'Doherty never attended art school, he became a prolific visual artist alongside his acclaimed brother, Mombassa. They had left Mental as Anything in 2000 to concentrate on their art and music careers. His wife Susan is also a visual artist, "[she] paints her more abstract pieces," while O'Doherty specialised in still life and built landscapes. He has entered the art competition of the Archibald Prize with his works relegated to the Salon des Refusés.

== Solo and side projects to Dog Trumpet ==
In 1987, with O'Doherty and Plaza with members of Gang Gajang, he recorded a country music album credited to the Stetsons. During the late 1980s and early 1990s he performed live with the bands the Bejesus Burgers and the Happening Thang.

Since 2000 O'Doherty's main musical outlet has been Dog Trumpet, a collaboration with Mombassa, formed as a side-project in 1991. The Dog Trumpet sound reflects affection for 1960s pop and psychedelia. They have released 8 albums and 3 EP's; the latest album is Shadowland, released on all formats on 4 November 2022.
