= Martin Plaza =

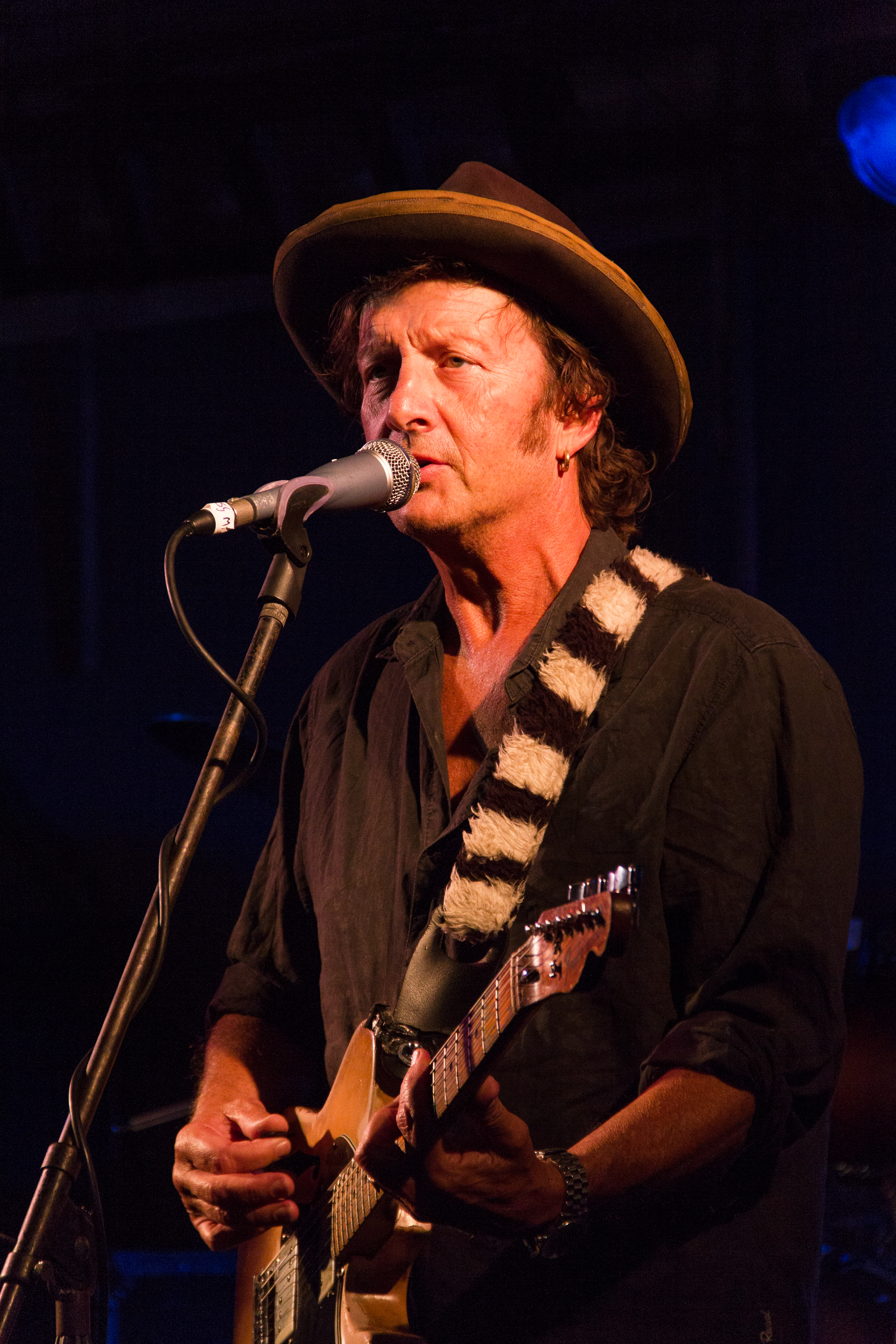
- Plaza performing in 2013

Background information
- Also known as: Martin DeJesus Plaza
- Born: Martin Edward Murphy; 23 December 1955 (age 69); Sydney, New South Wales, Australia
- Genres: New wave, rock
- Years active: 1982–present
- Labels: Regular; WEA; CBS Records; RCA Records; Liberation; Warner Music
- Website: Official website

Martin Edward Murphy (born 23 December 1955), commonly known by the pseudonym Martin Plaza, is an Australian singer-songwriter, musician and visual artist who is a founding member, vocalist and guitarist of the new wave band Mental As Anything. He has also worked with other bands and is an accomplished artist. Plaza also has a solo music career and had a No. 2 hit in Australia with his 1986 cover of the song "Concrete and Clay".

== Education and early career ==
Plaza was born Martin Edward Murphy on the North Shore of Sydney. He attended St. Pius X College in Chatswood, excelling in sporting and artistic pursuits but showing little interest in other subjects. After attending Hornsby Technical College he switched with fellow student Steve Coburn to the East Sydney Technical College in Darlinghurst in the mid-1970s where he met Chris O'Doherty. Around this time he was working part-time at Kentucky Fried Chicken. With O'Doherty (later known as Reg Mombassa), Coburn and another student, David Twohill, he formed the pop/rock band Mental As Anything in May 1976. Mental As Anything went on to become one of Australia's most popular bands touring widely in Australia and overseas.

== Art career ==
All early members of Mental As Anything are also artists in addition to being musicians and have exhibited their artworks since 1982. Whilst not being as acclaimed as bandmates Reg Mombassa or Peter O'Doherty, Plaza has become prolific in recent years. He has held numerous solo exhibitions working with a variety of media and has entered the Archibald Prize, notably with a self-portrait and a portrait of Mombassa. In the mid-1990s his artwork appeared on his own line of Dodgy-brand clothing as well as his designs appearing on Mambo clothing. Many of Plaza's artworks are Hawaiian in style.

== Pseudonym ==
In the early days of Mental As Anything, band members would often invent pseudonyms for each other that combined an exotic last name with a common Australian first name. Martin Plaza was one of the products of that amusement whilst obviously being inspired by the famous Sydney pedestrian mall Martin Place. He has in the past jokingly stated that his full name is Martin DeJesus Plaza.

== Solo and side projects ==
In 1986, Plaza performed with the Rock Party, a charity project initiated by the National Campaign Against Drug Abuse (NCADA) composed of many Australian and New Zealand artists including members of Crowded House, GANGgajang, Models and Mental As Anything. The Rock Party released a 12" single "Everything to Live For", which was produced by Joe Wissert, Phil Rigger and Phil Beazley.

In 1986, Plaza had a No. 2 hit in Australia with a cover of the 1960s Unit 4+2 song "Concrete and Clay", and the subsequent solo album Plaza Suite also charted. Further singles were not as successful. In 1991 another planned solo album morphed into a collaboration with former Models member, James Freud. Entitled Beatfish, it became one of the first Australian Dance or House albums. Another surprising turn was his 1994 album Andy's Chest. Composed almost entirely of Lou Reed covers, it divided critics at the time. Another collaboration with Freud in 1996 produced the Hawaiian-inspired Moondog project; however, Plaza only appears on some tracks.

== Discography ==
=== With Mental As Anything ===
- Get Wet (aka Mental As Anything) (1979)
- Espresso Bongo (1980)
- Cats & Dogs (aka If You Leave Me, Can I Come Too?) (1981)
- Creatures of Leisure (1983)
- Fundamental (1985)
- Mouth to Mouth (1987)
- Cyclone Raymond (1989)
- Liar Liar Pants on Fire (1995)
- Garàge (1998)
- Beetroot Stains (2000)
- Road Case (2002)
- Plucked (2005)
- Tents Up (2009)

=== With the Rock Party ===
| Title | Year | Peak chart positions | Album |
| Title | Year | AUS | Album |
|---|---|---|---|
| "Everything to Live For" | 1986 | - | Non-album single |

=== With Moondog ===
| Title | Album details | Peak chart positions |
| Title | Album details | AUS |
|---|---|---|
| Postcard to Hawaii | Released: 1996; Format: CD; Label: Camouflage | - |

=== Solo work ===
==== Studio albums ====
| Title | Album details | Peak chart positions |
| Title | Album details | AUS |
|---|---|---|
| Plaza Suite | Released: March 1986; Format: LP, Cassette; Label: CBS | 12 |
| Andy's Chest | Released: May 1994; Format: CD, cassette; Label: RCA | 58 |

==== Singles ====
| Title | Year | Peak chart positions | Album |
| Title | Year | AUS | Album |
|---|---|---|---|
| "Concrete and Clay" | 1986 | 2 | Plaza Suite |
| "Best Foot Forward" | 1986 | 51 | Plaza Suite |
| "Use Me All Over" | 1986 | — | Plaza Suite |
| "Labour of Love" | 1990 | 78 | Non-album single |
| "Satellite of Love" | 1994 | — | Andy's Chest |
| "Women" | 1994 | — | Andy's Chest |

==== Soundtracks ====
- "Working in the Coal Mine" from Razzle Dazzle: A Journey into Dance (2007)

== Awards ==
=== Australian Songwriters Hall of Fame ===
The Australian Songwriters Hall of Fame was established in 2004 to honour the lifetime achievements of some of Australia's greatest songwriters.

| Year | Nominee / work | Award | Result |
|---|---|---|---|
| 2019 | Andrew "Greedy" Smith and Martin Plaza (Mental As Anything) | Australian Songwriters Hall of Fame | Inducted |
