= Reg Mombassa =

NZ-Australian artist & musician (born 1951)

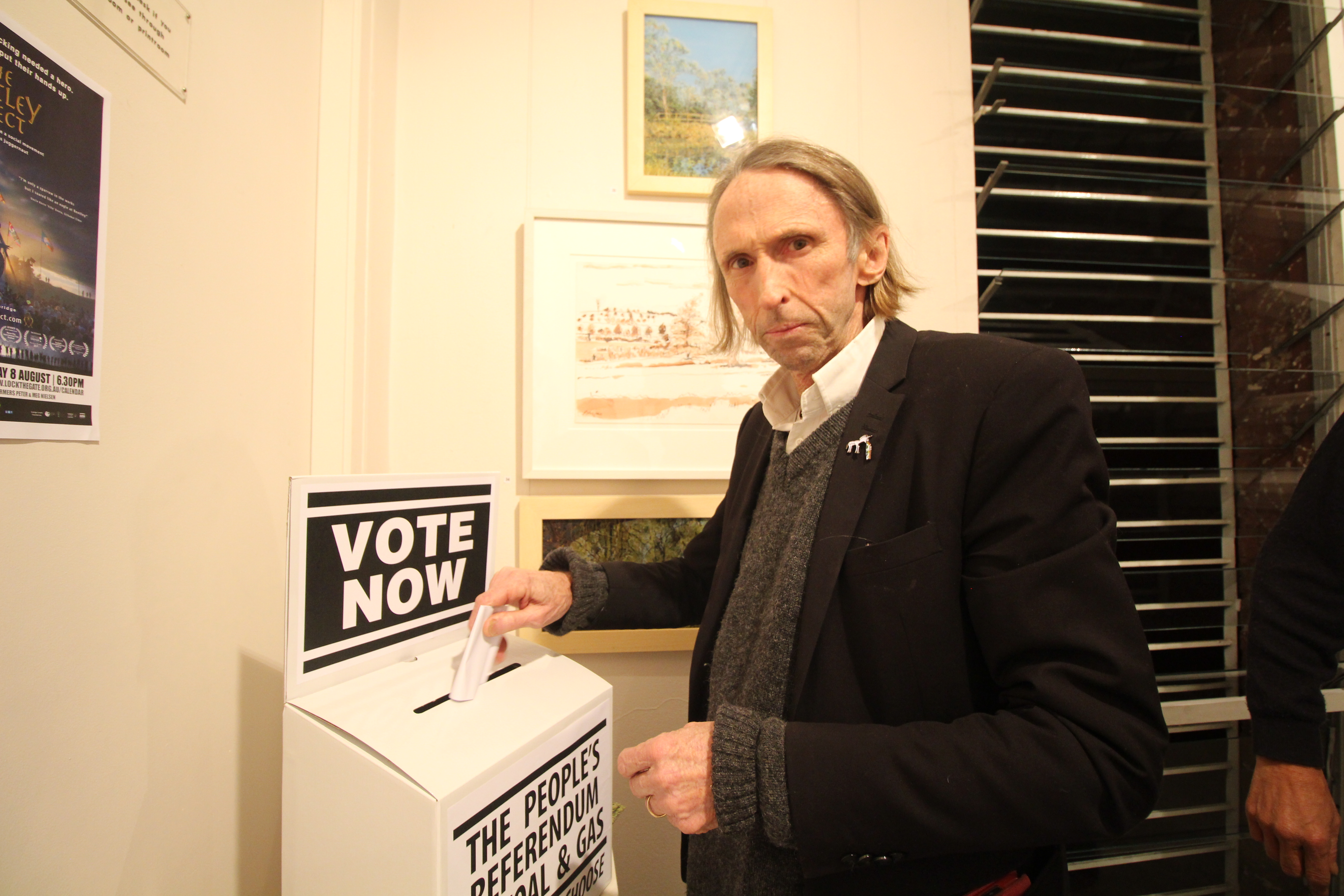

Background information
- Born: Christopher O'Doherty; 1951 (age 74–75); Auckland, New Zealand
- Occupations: Artist, musician
- Website: regmombassa.com

Christopher O'Doherty, also known by the pseudonym Reg Mombassa, is a New Zealand-born Australian artist and musician. He is a founding member of the band Mental As Anything and member of Dog Trumpet (alongside his brother Peter O'Doherty).

== Early and personal life ==
Mombassa was born Christopher O'Doherty in Auckland, New Zealand, on 14 August 1951. O'Doherty, his parents and younger brother Peter immigrated to Sydney, Australia, in 1969. He enrolled in what is now the National Art School in Darlinghurst in 1969 but left the following year. He returned again in 1975 and obtained his Diploma of Painting in 1977. Between and during his stints at college he supported himself with menial jobs such as builder's labouring, cleaning, house painting and working on the railways.

In 1976 he formed the rock band Mental as Anything with four fellow art school students, ostensibly to play at school parties. Although they did not initially intend to be a serious band, the Mentals, as they became known, eventually turned professional.

Mombassa is the father of comedian Claudia O'Doherty.

== Art career ==
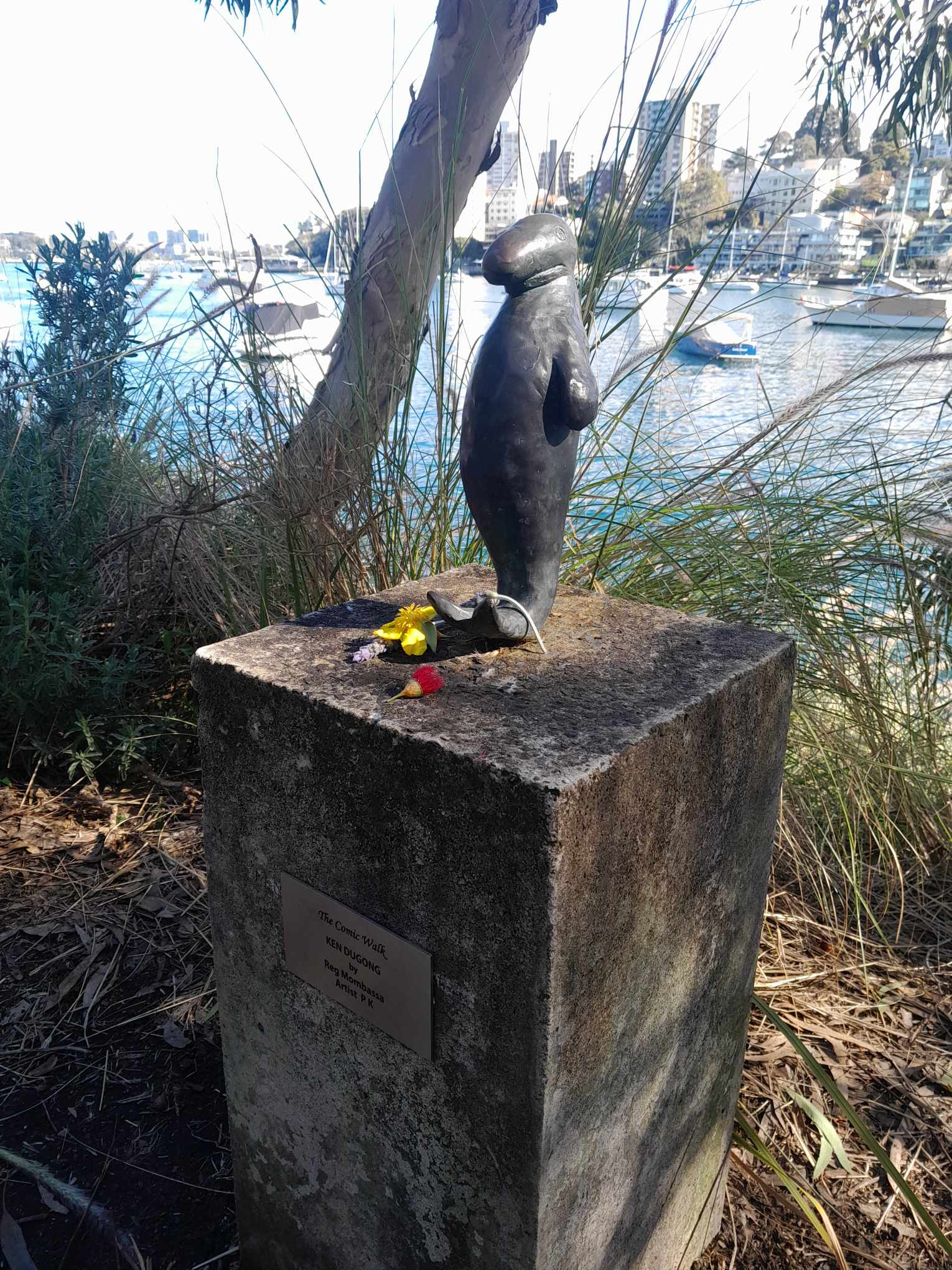
"Ken Dugong" sculptured designed by Mombassa, as carved by Peter Kingston, standing in Art Barton Park behind Luna Park Sydney.

Mombassa's artwork is in two distinctive styles. The type of artwork he designs for the Mambo fashion label is almost cartoonish and in vivid colours, incorporating religious, political and popular culture themes. He also produces landscapes and portraits, many of which are inspired by his childhood in New Zealand. His artworks can be found in the Art Gallery of New South Wales, the National Gallery of Australia and regional galleries. Patrick White, Elton John and Ewan McGregor have all purchased his work.

Mombassa's first public showing was in a group exhibition held at Watters Gallery in Sydney in 1975 while he was still attending art college. It was at this exhibition that Patrick White purchased some works and subsequently became a patron, purchasing many others over his life. He first exhibited solo at Watters in 1986, the year he also began designing clothing for Mambo. His works were exhibited in three Mental as Anything collective exhibitions in 1982, 1990 and 1998. Further solo shows were held at Watters in 1991, 1993, 1995 and 1998. Alongside posters, record covers and merchandise for Mental As Anything and Dog Trumpet, he has designed record covers for the likes of PIL, Crowded House, Mondo Rock and Paul Kelly. He has gifted artwork to many charitable and environmental organisations including Greenpeace and The Wilderness Society.

As Mombassa's artistic output and demand increased it prompted him to make the difficult decision to cease touring with the Mentals in April 2000. He has continued to design for Mambo and hold sellout exhibitions at Watters in 2001, 2003, 2005, 2007 and 2009.

In January 2000, a career retrospective of his work was held in Sydney at the S. H. Ervin Gallery. An 80-page catalogue was released by the National Trust to coincide with this exhibition. It also saw the release of "Golden Sandals" directed by Haydn Keenan, a documentary on Mombassa featuring animated versions of his artwork. In March 2007 his self-portrait was selected as a finalist in the Archibald Prize. 2 May 2007 saw the broadcast of "Golden Sandals" on SBS independent. One of his most famous works was "Self-Portrait with Spots and Veins" (2003). He was also featured on the ABC TV profile show Talking Heads. In 2009 he was featured on BBC TV's Peschardt's People. In November 2009 HarperCollins released a biography by Murray Waldren called "The mind and times of Reg Mombassa", which includes over 200 art works.

In 2013, Mombassa was the creative ambassador for Sydney New Year's Eve; the event featured a special one-minute display inspired by one of his paintings, and artwork of a giant blinking eye on Sydney Harbour Bridge.

== The origin of the name Reg Mombassa ==
In the early days of the Mentals, the band would often invent pseudonyms for each other that combined an exotic last name with a common Australian first name. "Reg Mombassa" was one of the products of that amusement. He has stated in interviews that some of his earlier pseudonyms included "Brett Orlando" and "Dorky Bladder".

== Dog Trumpet ==
In 1991, Mombassa formed the band Dog Trumpet with his brother Peter O'Doherty. Since leaving the Mentals this has been his sole musical outlet. Dog Trumpet has released eight studio albums and three EPs. The band's sixth album, Medicated Spirits was released in August 2013 and was long-listed for the Australian Music Prize Album of the Year award for 2013. Dog Trumpet released the album Great South Road in May 2020 and signed to Demon Music in 2021; and all of their albums at that time were issued on Vinyl on 29th Oct 2021. Dog Trumpet's seventh album, Great South Road, featured the singles "Gravity", "Wallpaper", "Lonely Death Cleaning Company", "You've Heard it All Before" and "Overseas and Elsewhere". The album garnered great reviews and because of COVID19 the brothers decided to do various performances live on Facebook to promote the album.

A new single and video, "F**king Idiots", was released 20 May 2022. Dog Trumpet released a further single. "The Ballad of Clayton Looby" on 9 September 2022, from their album, Shadowland, which was released on 4 November 2022, on vinyl, CD and digitally worldwide by the Demon Music Group. The video for "The Ballad of Clayton Looby", contains footage from some of Australia's 1970s surf films, including Alby Falzon's Morning of the Earth and Phil and Russell Shepard's A Winter's Tale and Paul Witzig's The Lost Witzig Reels. "Nina Simone" the third single from Shadowland, was released on 7 October 2022. A video for the title track was released on 12 December 2022

Shadowland is a distinctive blending of psychedelia, folk and blues, the album probes the perils and absurdities of human existence, kicking off with the title track "Shadowland", a nervous musing on digital over-surveillance; followed by "Nina Simone", a song reflecting on romance and memory. "F***ing Idiots" points out the shameful idiocy of our addiction to war and militarism; "The Ballad of Clayton Looby" is an anti-establishment ode to a larrikin surfer.

== Other music and films ==
In 1987, with Peter, Martin Plaza and members of GANGgajang, Mombassa recorded a country music album credited to The Stetsons.

Mombassa has also appeared in a number of small Australian films, including Tender Hooks (1989), Strange Planet (1999) and Love's Brother (2004).
