= David Twohill =

- Also known as: Wayne DeLisle; Wayne "Bird" DeLisle; David "Bird" Twohill
- Born: 21 April 1954 (age 72); Cooma, New South Wales, Australia
- Genres: Rock
- Occupation: Drummer
- Instrument: Drums
- Years active: 1976–present

David Twohill (born 21 April 1954) is an Australian musician formerly with rock band Mental As Anything who is also known by the pseudonym Wayne DeLisle or as Bird.

== Early life ==
Twohill was born in Cooma, New South Wales, Australia on 21 April 1954. After matriculating at Waverley College in 1972, where he was the drummer in a school band named "Thackeray's Onion", he attended the East Sydney Technical College at Darlinghurst. Here he met, and later auditioned on drums with, fellow students Chris O'Doherty, Martin Murphy and Steve Coburn who were putting a band together. The band would soon be called Mental As Anything and would become well known around Australia and the world.

== Mental As Anything ==
Twohill performed under the pseudonym Wayne de Lisle for most of his time as a member. In September 2004 he was sacked from the band by two of his bandmates. He lodged a wrongful dismissal case against his former bandmates with the NSW Industrial Relations Commission in 2007, which he won.

== 2001 bushfires ==
Twohill, with his wife Sue, was in the national news on Christmas Day 2001 when their house was lost in bushfires—a benefit gig, Bird's Big Burnout, occurred at Revesby in early 2002 and a four-piece Midnight Oil minus Peter Garrett performed.

== After Mental as Anything ==
Following his dismissal from Mental as Anything, Twohill performed with various other bands, including Mangrove Boogie Kings, Jim Moginie's Shameless Seamus and The Tullamore Dews, 50 Million Beers, and the BarStars with Gunther Gorman from Daddy Cool. He also collaborates with an artists' cooperative in his hometown.
