= Had to Phone Ya =

1976 song performed by The Beach Boys

Single by the Beach Boys

from the album 15 Big Ones
- A-side: "It's O.K."
- Released: August 30, 1976
- Recorded: March 30, 1976
- Studio: Brother (Santa Monica)
- Length: 1:43
- Label: Brother/Reprise
- Songwriters: Brian Wilson, Mike Love, Diane Rovell
- Producer: Brian Wilson

The Beach Boys singles chronology
"Rock and Roll Music" (1976)	"Had to Phone Ya" (1976)	"Everyone's in Love with You" (1976)

Audio sample
- file; help

"Had to Phone Ya"

Song by American Spring

from the album Spring
- Released: 1988
- Recorded: 1973
- Length: 2:02
- Songwriters: Brian Wilson, Diane Rovell
- Producer: Brian Wilson

"Had to Phone Ya" is a song by the American rock band the Beach Boys from their 1976 album 15 Big Ones. It was written by Brian Wilson, his sister-in-law Diane Rovell, and Mike Love. The song was issued as the B-side to their single "It's O.K.". An earlier recording by the group American Spring was included as a bonus track on a later reissue of the album Spring (1972).

== Background ==
Brian Wilson and Mike Love wrote the song, with Diane Rovell also contributing. Diane was originally listed as a cowriter, but her name was removed from songwriting credits in subsequent releases. She is still listed as co-writer in the Broadcast Music, Inc. database.

Byron Preiss described the song's creation by Brian Wilson while his wife Marilyn was away in Europe. Brian spoke about the song in 1995:

All I wanted to do was to make a person feel they were free to call at any time-if they felt the world was upside down, they could call and I could correct their world. In other words, I wanted to feel like I can call somebody and tell them, "Look, I’m swamped, I’m scared, I got all these emotions deep inside of me."

Lindsay Planer of Allmusic noted "Although the tune may sound uncomplicated, it is part of a larger sonic tapestry that combines the interaction of several simultaneous melodies." noting similarities to earlier Brian Wilson compositions "Good Vibrations" and "Love to Say Dada". Musician Dennis Diken compared it to Wilson's "Trombone Dixie".

"Had to Phone Ya" was originally recorded in 1973 by American Spring at Junior's Motel in Otho, Iowa. Their version was released as a bonus track for the CD reissue of the album Spring (1972).

== Recording ==
The Beach Boys' version of "Had to Phone Ya" was recorded on March 30, 1976, at Brother Studios in the middle of the primary sessions for 15 Big Ones. The lead vocals are swapped between the band members. The instrumental track from this session was made available on the 2013 compilation Made in California.

== Personnel ==
Per 2026 liner notes.

The Beach Boys

- Al Jardine – lead, harmony and backing vocals
- Mike Love – lead, harmony and backing vocals
- Brian Wilson – lead, harmony and backing vocal; acoustic grand piano
- Carl Wilson – lead, harmony and backing vocals
- Dennis Wilson – lead, harmony and backing vocals; drums

Guest

- Marilyn Wilson – spoken word

Session musicians and production staff

- Arnold Belnick – violin
- Ed Carter – electric guitar
- Steve Douglas – tenor saxophone
- Dennis Dreith – clarinet
- Henry Ferber – violin
- Billy Hinsche – electric guitar
- William Kurasch – violin
- Jay Migliori – baritone saxophone
- Stephen Moffitt – sound engineer
- Jules Jacobs – clarinet
- Lyle Ritz – double bass
- Sidney Sharp – violin
- Bobby Shew – trumpet
- Julius Wechter – bongos
