= 15 Big Ones =

1976 album by the Beach Boys

Studio album by the Beach Boys
- Released: July 5, 1976
- Recorded: 1974 – May 15, 1976 (except "Susie Cincinnati", 1969 – 1970)
- Studios: Brother (Santa Monica); Beach Boys (Los Angeles); Caribou Ranch (Nederland)
- Genres: Rock and roll; R&B; pop
- Length: 39:20
- Label: Brother/Reprise
- Producer: Brian Wilson

The Beach Boys chronology
20 Golden Greats (1976)	15 Big Ones (1976)	The Beach Boys Love You (1977)

Singles from 15 Big Ones
- 1. "Rock and Roll Music" b/w "T M Song" Released: May 24, 1976; 2. "It's OK" b/w "Had to Phone Ya" Released: August 30, 1976; 3. "Everyone's in Love with You" b/w "Susie Cincinnati" Released: November 8, 1976

15 Big Ones is the twentieth studio album by the American rock band the Beach Boys, released on July 5, 1976, by Brother/Reprise. It includes a mix of original songs and renditions of rock and roll and R&B standards. The LP was the band's first album with production credited solely to Brian Wilson since Pet Sounds (1966) and its recording followed a three-year period in which he had withdrawn into depression and the band were largely focused on concert touring. Unsuccessful in releasing or finishing material they had accumulated since 1974, the members and manager Stephen Love prevailed upon Wilson, then recovering from addiction, to lead the group's next release.

Most of 15 Big Ones was recorded in early 1976 at the band's Brother Studios with the initial intention that Wilson record a collection of deliberately "under-produced" cover renditions and subsequently yield a potential double album of all-original songs. The project was marred by creative disputes, other health issues among the members, Wilson's reluctance, and conflicts with his psychologist Eugene Landy. One of the proposed titles, Group Therapy, was rejected in favor of a title that referred to both the number of tracks and the group's 15th anniversary. It included five songs written or co-written by Wilson in addition to Mike Love's "Everyone's in Love with You" and Al Jardine's "Susie Cincinnati".

The release was accompanied by Wilson's return to major concert touring after a twelve-year absence and a controversial media campaign that declared "Brian Is Back!". The group also commissioned an NBC television special, titled The Beach Boys, that aired in August. Despite mixed reviews, 15 Big Ones was the band's best-selling album of new material since 1965, earning a gold certification from the RIAA. It peaked at number 8 in the U.S. and number 31 in the UK. Three singles were issued: a cover of Chuck Berry's "Rock and Roll Music" (number 5) and the originals "It's OK" (number 29) and "Everyone's in Love with You". The former two were their only top 30 hits in this decade. Brian later referred to 15 Big Ones and its 1977 follow-up, The Beach Boys Love You, as his favorite Beach Boys albums.

== Background ==
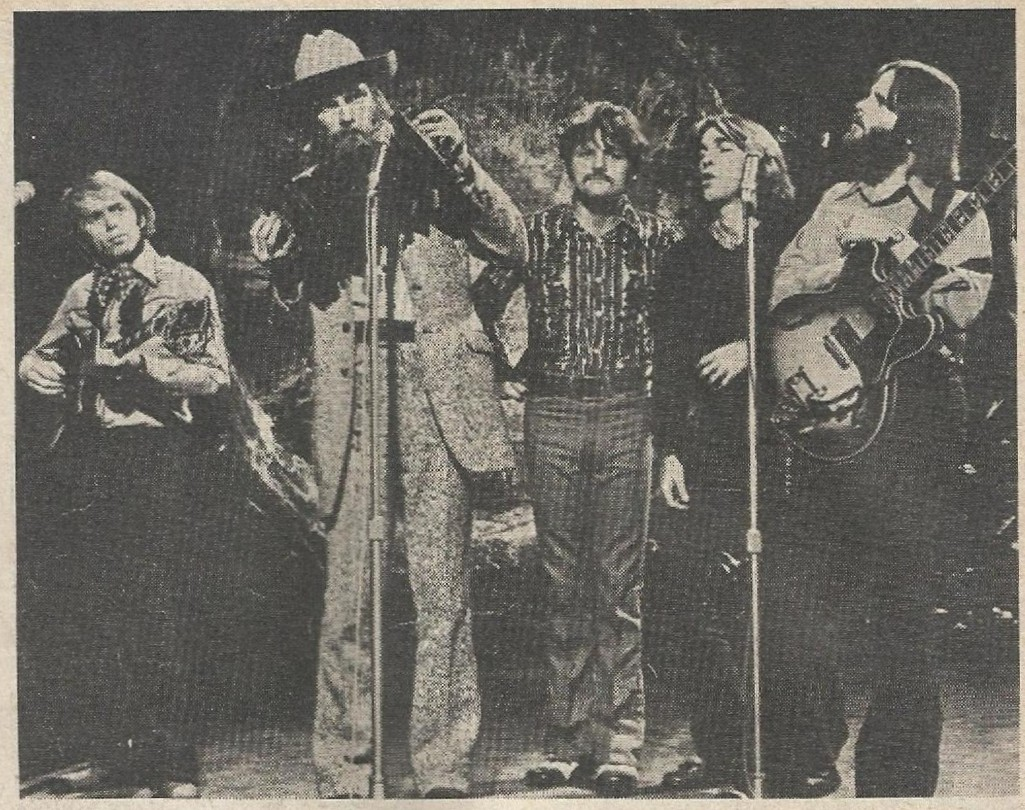
The Beach Boys performing in early 1972, months before recording their previous album Holland (1973)

In January 1973, the Beach Boys' previous album, Holland, was released amid generally favorable reviews and top 40 entries in the U.S. and UK charts. Early copies of the LP were packaged with a bonus EP, Mount Vernon and Fairway, that was produced by Brian and Carl Wilson. Brian's original concept for Mount Vernon and Fairway was to be "much more ambitious", consisting of renditions of 1950s songs like "A Casual Look". His bandmates took issue with the space it would have taken on the LP, and he subsequently lost interest, leaving Carl to finish the project.

The group maintained a touring regimen, but recorded very little in the studio for the next two years. Several months earlier, they had announced that they would complete their unfinished album Smile, but this never came to fruition, and plans for its release were once again abandoned. (Note: Pursuant to the terms of their record contract, when the group missed their May 1973 deadline to deliver the Smile album, Warner Bros. deducted $50,000 from the band's next advance.) Following the June 1973 death of the Wilsons' father and former band manager Murry, Brian retreated into his bedroom and withdrew further into drug abuse, alcoholism, chain smoking, and overeating. He reflected, "I used my room as my little castle. Added to that, I was very depressed with the Beach Boys. I couldn't talk to them and nobody in the band could relate to me. This went on for about two and a half years. But, on and off, I'd sometimes go and record."

In October 1973, the band fired their manager, Jack Rieley. By his account, he had "pulled away" from the band due to "terribly complex, complicated and horribly distasteful situations involving aspects of their business and financial management." Rieley's position was succeeded by Mike Love's brother Steve and Chicago manager James William Guercio. Blondie Chaplin and Ricky Fataar, who had joined the Beach Boys as official members in 1972, left the band in December 1973 and November 1974, respectively.

The Beach Boys' greatest hits compilation Endless Summer was released in June 1974 to unexpected success, becoming the band's second number-one U.S. album in October. The LP had a 155-week chart run, selling over 3 million copies, and led the group to reclaim themselves as the number-one act in the U.S. amid a new generation of fans. Guercio prevailed upon the group to swap out newer songs with older material in their concert setlists, partly to accommodate their growing audience and the demand for their early hits. Later in the year, members of the band appeared as guests on Chicago's hit "Wishing You Were Here". At the end of 1974, Rolling Stone proclaimed the Beach Boys "Band of the Year" based on the strength of their live performances.

== Early recording history (1974–1975) ==
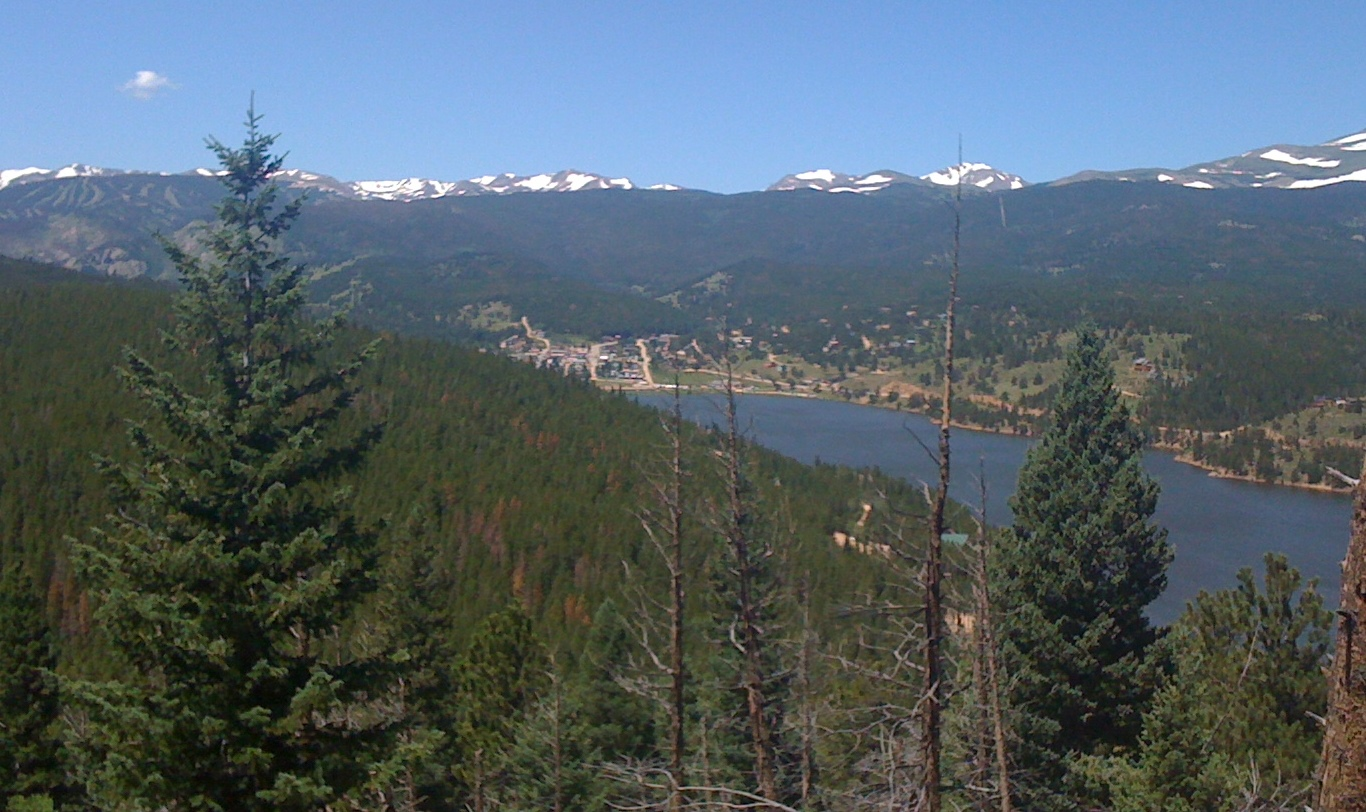
The band initially convened at Caribou Ranch in the Colorado mountains (pictured) to record their fifth studio album for Reprise.

To capitalize on their sudden resurgence in popularity, the Beach Boys accepted Guercio's invitation to record their next Reprise album at his Caribou Ranch studio, located around the mountains of Nederland, Colorado. These November 1974 sessions marked the group's return to the studio after a 21-month period of virtual inactivity, but the proceedings were cut short after Brian had insisted on returning to his home in Los Angeles. Guercio remembered, "From the day he got here, he said, 'I want to go home.'" Contrary to popular belief, the fire that occurred at Caribou Ranch in 1985 is unlikely to have destroyed any Beach Boy tapes, as they would often take their tapes back to Brother Studio after recording at other studios. After the sessions had concluded, the band resumed touring for the remainder of the year.

Only four songs have been documented as being recorded at Caribou: "Battle Hymn of the Republic", "Good Timin'", a new version of "Ding Dang" (later retitled as Rollin' Up to Heaven), and an additional unidentified backing track. Wilson had resumed his songwriting collaboration with poet Stephen Kalinich (who did not accompany the band to Colorado), resulting in such songs as "Child of Winter", "California Feelin'", "You're Riding High on the Music" (written for John Kay) and "Lucy Jones" (intended for an unrealized Wilson-produced Kalinich rock album). "You're Riding High on the Music" was never recorded. "Lucy Jones", as described by Kalinich, "was just a funky song, and Brian and I were having fun." Long believed to have been written by Wilson and Kalinch in 1974, "Grateful Are We for Little Children" dates from their earlier collaboration in the late 1960s. (Note: A part of the melody of the unrecorded song was later interpolated into Wilson's "Saturday Morning in the City".)

In November 1974, Mike Love told Melody Maker that the band had completed "about 40 tracks" and that their next album would be completed by January 1975. Love reported, "Brian is very involved with the LP. [...] The album's a combination between Sunflower and Holland. It's got some of the feel that Holland had, but also sounds a bit like Sunflower in certain respects." The material was written by himself ("about ten" of the songs), Brian (five), Carl and Dennis ("about five" each), and Jardine ("a couple"). He described "Don't Let Me Go" as a song composed by Carl with lyrics by Love, and "Our Life, Our Love, Our Land" as a song written by Love that he described as an "ethnic thing" that resembled "The Trader" from Holland. (Note: Some of the lines in "Don't Let Me Go" are "Like a ship on the ocean/That finally reaches shore/After seeming ceaseless motion/Welcome home with great emotion/ Thank you for your love and devotion". According to Alan Boyd, neither song resides in the Beach Boy vaults and were possibly never recorded.) In reality, by the end of 1974 the group had only completed a small selection of tracks in the studio, and were mostly focused on touring. Additional songs recorded in 1974 include "River Song", "Ding Dang", "Barnyard Blues", "It's OK", and a rendition of "Honeycomb" (unrelated to the American Spring recording).

Released as a single at the end of December 1974, "Child of Winter" was the first Beach Boys record since 1966 to have displayed the label credit "Produced by Brian Wilson". The band toured for most of 1975, playing college football stadiums and basketball arenas. Meanwhile, Brian produced a cover of "Why Do Fools Fall in Love?" for California Music. (Note: According to biographer Steven Gaines, Wilson had refused to finish any more tracks for California Music. Conversely, Stephen Love said that Wilson was ousted from the project. "We were under contract with Warner Bros., and we couldn't have him going on a tangent. If he was going to be productive, it's gotta be for the Beach Boys.") Over the summer, the touring group played a co-headlining series of concert dates with Chicago, a pairing that was nicknamed "Beachago". The tour was massively successful and restored the Beach Boys' profitability to what it had been in the mid-1960s.

Dennis and Carl had worked for a full two years, probably [...] trying to get the best possible Beach Boys songs that they could, and it wouldn't fly without Brian's name on it. I heard that, literally, from business people. "'Til you get Brian on there, it's not gonna happen."

— Engineer Earle Mankey

In a July 1975 article for NME, Nick Kent reported that Carl Wilson had cited "Rollin' Up to Heaven" (retitled from "Ding Dang"), "California Feelin'", and "Good Timing" [sic] as "titles to new Brian Wilson songs recorded for the next Warner/Reprise album". Carl told Kent that the new songs demonstrated Brian's new "funky" approach. In September, the band recorded an unreleased version of the Del-Vikings' "Come Go with Me". In October, Wilson recorded a rendition of Van Dyke Parks' "Come to the Sunshine", also intended for the band's forthcoming album, but reportedly Brian could not find the master.

== Main production (January–May 1976) ==
Although another joint tour with Chicago had been planned for the summer of 1976, the Beach Boys' association with Guercio and his Caribou Management company ended early in the year. (Note: According to biographer Steven Gaines, Guercio may have been fired because members of the group "felt Caribou was being overpaid", although "many observers suggest the Beach Boys followed an old pattern of jettisoning personnel when their financial situation improved." Biographer Mark Dillon states that the tour evaporated due to Dennis' budding romance with Karen Lamm, the ex-wife of Chicago keyboardist Robert Lamm.) Stephen Love subsequently took over as the band's de facto business manager. By then, the group had fallen three albums behind schedule in their contract with Warner Bros. In late 1975, Wilson had volunteered himself into psychologist Eugene Landy's 24-hour therapy program. Encouraged by the positive results, Stephen and Wilson's bandmates requested that Wilson produce the album that became 15 Big Ones. He had not been credited as the sole producer on a Beach Boys LP since Pet Sounds (1966).

According to Dennis, the group "couldn't agree on enough" with regards to the songs that they had stockpiled. Shortly before the sessions had commenced, he explained that the fate of the band's wealth of unreleased material depended on the individual songwriters, and lamented that the pressure to release songs had detracted from the creative enjoyment. He reported that the group had planned to issue one album of oldies and a potential double album consisting of "all-new material that stretches from hard rock and roll to these wordless vocals we've been doing that sound like the Vienna Boys Choir."

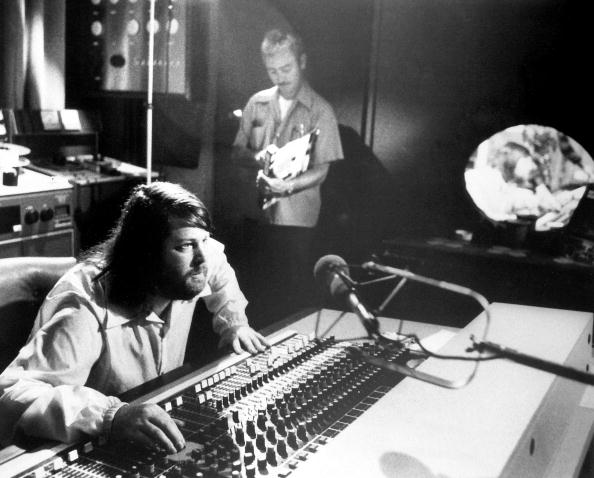
Brian Wilson (left) behind the mixing board of Brother Studios with engineer Stephen Moffitt, c. January 1976

The principal 15 Big Ones sessions lasted from January 30 to May 15, 1976 at Brother Studios. Studio staff engineers Stephen Moffitt and Earle Mankey, the latter a former member of Sparks, were enlisted for the project. Carl and Dennis assisted Brian with the instrumental tracks, while Al Jardine and Mike Love contributed just vocals. Group meetings were supervised by Landy. Landy said in a 1988 interview, "Brian and I did that [album] together", and band road manager Rick Nelson acknowledged that Landy had attempted to exert unwelcome artistic control over the group.

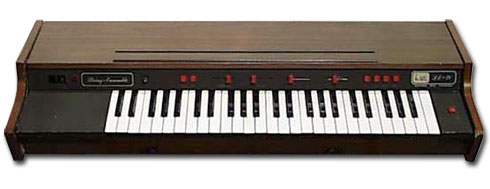
An ARP String Ensemble was used on several tracks

Before the songs were chosen, the band had agreed to let Brian commit to what Carl termed a "consciously under-producing" approach. In his 2016 memoir, I Am Brian Wilson, it is stated that he suffered from a bout of laryngitis during the sessions and that his singing was not his "normal voice [...] It was an assumed voice." He made prominent use of Moog and ARP synthesizers; Mankey surmised that these were employed "to fake string parts [...] and not have to worry about anything else. He was in there to play the part and get out."

As a warm-up exercise, Wilson first recorded a batch of oldies with many of the session musicians that he had worked with during the mid-1960s. Initially, he was to have produced one or two albums of all-original material after finishing these oldies exercises. Crawdaddy journalist Timothy White, an observer of much of the album's recording, explained that the premise "represented a compromise at a stage when the Boys had felt stymied as a unit and reluctant to commit their own recent or stockpiled individual compositions to a communal album that didn't mainly feature Brian's work." Stephen observed that the band "had mixed feelings about [Brian's comeback] because they knew it would frustrate their own designs for their own music. But they probably liked it economically, because they knew it was going to get them a bigger record deal."

=== Disagreements ===
Brian recalled feeling reluctant to produce the band "because we had drifted apart, personality-wise" but ultimately arrived "to the studio with the attitude that we had to get it done." Following two days of sessions, during which the band recorded "Palisades Park" and "Blueberry Hill", the recording temporarily halted due to disagreements regarding the album's direction. Mankey said, "It was really tense in the studio. Brian would come in around nine or ten in the morning. One day, they would get something done, and the next day they would do nothing except fight." He remembered that Wilson had also run into difficulty engaging with musicians he was unfamiliar with, calling it "the fastest sessions ever. [...] At the end of the song Brian would say, 'That sounded great, guys!' and head for the door." According to Brian, "I started to change my mind [about producing the album], and they said, 'Come on, come on, Brian. You can't stop.'"

Once we had finished a certain batch of songs Brian said, "That's it. Put it out." That's why the album sounds unfinished. Brian just wanted to do one cut and capture the moment rather than working on something."

— Carl Wilson

The other band members had struggled to accommodate Brian's decreased attention to production quality. Carl abruptly left a meeting due to a dispute over the songs voted to be "under-produced" but later returned "and worked my ass off" in service to his brother and bandmate. Dennis later complained that he had been "unhappy with the oldies – absolutely" and striving for all-original content, given ample Brian compositions had been available: "Carl and I were really upset." Stephen advocated for an immediate release to capitalize on the band's commercial momentum and satisfy their business demands; Dennis later complained, "Steve Love, Mike Love and Alan Jardine were pushing to get it out – it was just a big push."

Without Brian's knowledge, the other members refined the mixes in opposition to his preferred "dry" production quality. According to Jardine, he and his bandmates had felt that Brian, at this time, had lacked the competence to singlehandedly produce the album. Mike attributed the album's "rough sections" in part to Carl suffering "a debilitating back injury" and cormorbid "self-medicating and drinking". Stephen said, "Carl was dragging his feet, saying, 'This is a shitty record. This isn't anywhere near as good as it should be.'" Mankey remembered that everybody in the studio had felt sorry for Brian and offered their assistance in bettering his work, with the exception of Love and Jardine, who "just thought it was crap. They'd show up and say it was terrible."

Sessions resumed in early March. Ultimately, a compromise was reached, with the album including a mix of covers and originals. Brian told an interviewer, "15 Big Ones started out as an album of nothing but oldies, but then we ran out of them. Halfway through, Mike Love decided to make the record half old and half new. I didn't like the idea at first, but he literally forced us to do it his way. I resented that." The group had recorded about two dozen different songs, mostly cover versions, by the time the sessions had wrapped.

== Songs ==
=== Originals ===
"It's OK", written by Brian and Mike, is an upbeat song about celebrating summer fun. "Had to Phone Ya" was written by Wilson while his wife Marilyn was away in Europe. "Everyone's in Love with You", written about the Maharishi Mahesh Yogi, was Mike Love's second ever solo contribution to a Beach Boys album. "That Same Song" was described by Carlin as "a whimsical history of world music that came close to sparking the gospel fire it set out to ignite". "T M Song" begins with a mock argument between the band members, possibly based on the real life arguments that had been occurring among themselves.

Two of the songs predated the album by several years. The first, "Susie Cincinnati", is Al Jardine's only writing contribution to the album. It was recorded in 1969 during the sessions for the album Sunflower (1970). Brian included it on 15 Big Ones "because it's a good song", although Dennis felt that it was a "silly piece of shit". (Note: The song was first issued in January 1970 as the B-side of the "Add Some Music to Your Day" single, and then again in December 1974 as the B-side of the "Child of Winter" single.) "Back Home" was originally written in 1963 by Brian and his roommate Bob Norberg. It is semi-autobiographical; Brian sings in the chorus of wanting to return to Ohio, which happened to be the homestate of his great-grandparents. Carlin notes the 15 Big Ones version for featuring "a throbbing bass, bouncing organ riffs, and a spirited vocal from Brian."

=== Cover versions and outtakes ===
According to Wilson, "We thought about songs that were standards and, since they were acceptable once, we figured they would be acceptable again. [...] We figured it was a safe way to go." Chuck Berry's "Rock and Roll Music" was chosen, according to Love, because he felt that the band could possibly repeat the success they had with covering Berry's "Sweet Little Sixteen" as "Surfin' U.S.A." (1963). Dennis was originally slated to sing the lead on their cover of Fats Domino's "Blueberry Hill", but Wilson gave the part to Love so that Love would not feel left out. "Palisades Park", originally by Freddy Cannon, had been the source of inspiration for the Beach Boys' songs "County Fair" (1962) and "Amusement Parks U.S.A." (1965). Carl recorded his vocal in one take. Brian praised Carl's performance and ranked it as "one of my top five Beach Boys vocals. He nailed it."

The other six selections included on the album were "Chapel of Love" (originally by Darlene Love), "Talk to Me" (originally by Little Willie John), , "A Casual Look" (originally by the Six Teens), "In the Still of the Night" (originally by the Five Satins), and "Just Once in My Life" (originally by the Righteous Brothers). In the assessment of musicologist Philip Lambert, most of the covers remained faithful to the originals, however, "Blueberry Hill", "Talk to Me", and "Palisades Park" were the exceptions in which the listener gets "more of a sense of the younger Brian Wilson".

Although they were not included on the album, the band also recorded versions of "Sea Cruise", "On Broadway", "Mony Mony", "Running Bear", "Shake, Rattle and Roll", "Don't Fight the Sea", "Peggy Sue", "Michael Rowed the Boat Ashore", and "Let's Dance". Other discarded tracks included the originals "Short Skirts" (Brian), "Lisa" (Mike), "10,000 Years Ago (Mike and Dennis)", and "Rainbows" (Dennis and Carl).

== Packaging and artwork ==
Group Therapy was a title for the album that had been proposed by either Dennis or Brian. Brian's 2016 memoir states, "That was the name of a band Ray Kennedy was in back in the '60s, and that might have been in the back of my mind, but mainly I thought of it because it summed up everything that was happening at the time." The title was rejected in favor of Dean Torrence's suggestion, 15 Big Ones, which referred to both the number of tracks and the group's 15th anniversary.

Graphic designer Dean Torrence used the logo for the Olympic Games as the basis for the 15 Big Ones cover artwork

15 Big Ones was packaged with cover artwork that showed photos of the individual band members inside five interlocking rings, resembling the logo for the Olympic Games. This was an intentional reference to the fact that 1976 had been an Olympic year. A logo that displayed the band's name, designed by Torrence, was introduced with this release, becoming the Beach Boys' official logo until the 2010s.

Mike Love reflected, "The images of Brian, Dennis, Carl, Al, and me in five interlocking circles could have been a metaphor for five bandmates united in common purpose, or five guys living in their separate worlds. With us, it was both."

== Release and promotion ==
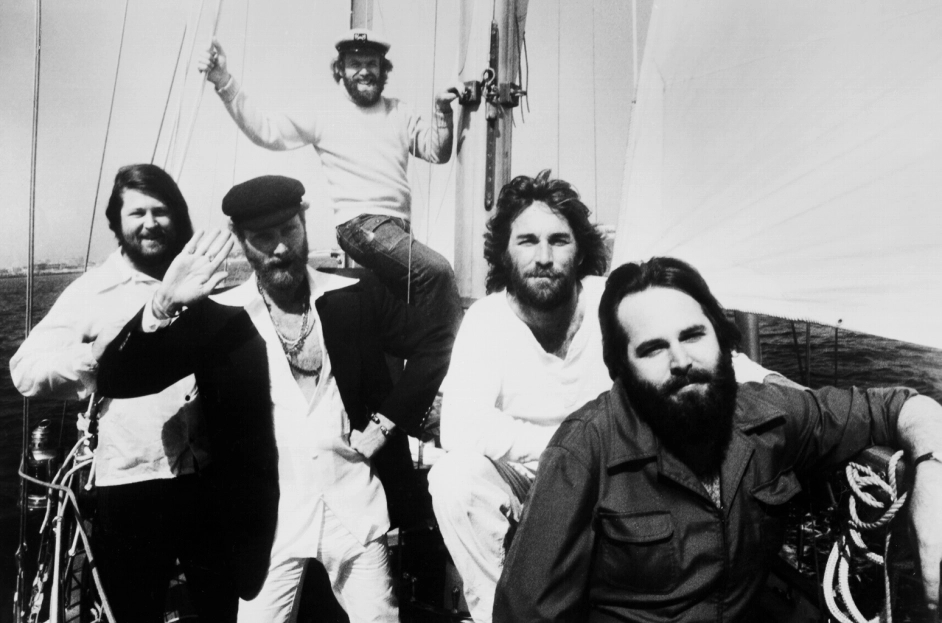
The group in a publicity shot from 1976

To highlight Brian's recovery and his return to writing and producing, Stephen Love devised a promotional campaign with the tagline "Brian Is Back!", and paid the Rogers & Cowan publicity agency $3,500 per month to implement it (equivalent to $20,000 in 2025). In Gaines' description, the resultant "media coverage was enormous", appearing across Newsweek, New West, Rolling Stone, Crawdaddy, the New York Times, and the Los Angeles Times. It marked the highest level of press attention that Wilson had received since Derek Taylor's "Brian Wilson is a genius" campaign from 1966.

On May 24, 1976, lead single "Rock and Roll Music" (backed with "T M Song") was released as the band's first new single in 16 months, peaking in the U.S. at number 5, their highest chart position for a single since "Good Vibrations" (1966). In June, Wilson gave his first press interviews in several years, and, in July, the band produced a six-hour documentary retrospective for U.S. radio. Starting on July 2, he made regular concert appearances with his bandmates for the first time since December 1964, singing and alternating between piano and bass. Some reports erroneously state that it was the first time Wilson had appeared onstage with the band since 1964; in fact, Wilson had last done so in 1973. From July 3 to August 15, 1976, the group embarked on a string of major stadium concert dates across the U.S. Supporting musicians included Billy Hinsche (guitar), Ed Carter (guitar, bass), Ron Altbach (keyboards), and Carlos Muñoz (keyboards). The setlists for these dates included the 15 Big Ones selections "Susie Cincinnati", "Palisades Park", "It's OK", "A Casual Look", "Back Home", and "Rock and Roll Music".

At the centerpiece of the "Brian Is Back!" campaign was the release of 15 Big Ones on July 5, coinciding with a concert at Anaheim Stadium on the same day. The album peaked at number 8 in the U.S., becoming their first top 10 album of new material since Pet Sounds, and their highest-charting studio album since Summer Days (And Summer Nights!!) (1965). It also became their second Warner Bros. release to be certified gold.

=== Controversy ===
Maybe it would have been more accurate to say, "We think and hope Brian's on his way back!" But that's not gonna cut it for a professional [media] campaign.

— Band manager Stephen Love, orchestrator of the "Brian Is Back!" campaign

Despite its success, the media campaign proved controversial. Landy involved himself by openly discussing Wilson's condition and other aspects of his personal life to reporters. Wilson often solicited drugs from his interviewers, potentially in jest, and remarked on one occasion that he had "felt like a prisoner". A Newsweek journalist reported that Jardine and Mike Love were "all for letting Brian take full charge, even though Love makes no secret of resenting him." Other coverage reported on his family preventing access to his funds, demeaning treatment by Landy, and controlling teenage bodyguard. Harvey Kubernick of Melody Maker, who attended the Anaheim concert, reported that Wilson "shouldn't be subjected to being propped up on stage for video purposes or group/media examination" and "seemed uncomfortable". Writing in 1980, Sounds journalist Sandy Robertson reflected that earlier optimistic coverage of Wilson had downplayed his condition and marked a stark contrast from his past as a creator of hit records. (Note: Critic Alexis Petridis concurred that the coverage had been "heartbreaking and horrifying in equal measure, depicting a halting, visibly terrified man".)

On August 5, NBC premiered a Lorne Michaels-produced television special about the band, called simply The Beach Boys; it included live performances of "Rock and Roll Music" and "It's OK", both drawn from the Anaheim concert, and "That Same Song", filmed with the 75-piece Double Rock Baptist Choir. Following the tour, the Beach Boys played a further dozen concert dates at stadiums and basketball arenas, this time without Brian's participation. On August 23, the band were the subject of a five-page cover story on that week's issue of People magazine. The album's second single, "It's OK" (backed with "Had to Phone Ya"), was issued in the U.S. on August 30 and peaked at number 29. On September 17, Brian appeared as a guest presenter on Don Kirshner's Annual Rock Music Awards program, where he was nominated for the Hall of Fame category and lost to the Beatles. Carl and Dennis accompanied him to the podium.

In November, Rolling Stone published David Felton's feature story, "The Beach Boys: The Healing of Brother Bri" [sic], which presented unfavorable depictions of the band and their entourage of family and friends. On November 8, the third and last single, "Susie Cincinnati" (backed with "Everyone's in Love with You") was issued in the U.S. and failed to chart. On November 16, BBC-2 premiered an episode of The Old Grey Whistle Test that included host Bob Harris' interview with Brian, which had been filmed on September 21. Wilson made his first talk show appearance on November 23, on The Mike Douglas Show, followed by an appearance on NBC's Saturday Night, on November 26. Both appearances included a performance of "Back Home".

== Initial reviews ==
15 Big Ones received mixed reviews and was largely disliked by the group's fanbase. Much of the criticism centered around the cover songs, its overall unfinished, forced, or rushed quality, and Dennis' and Brian's rough vocal performances. In the assessment of biographer Peter Ames Carlin, one of the "more distressing" characteristicss was Brian's degenerated voice.

White wrote in his Crawdaddy review that the album was a disappointment; although it "does boast several bright moments – but no brilliant ones." A reviewer for The Village Voice described the album as "the kind of music one might expect to find at a rock star's funeral." Carlin states that most other reviewers "gave 15 Big Ones gentle treatment", such as in Newsweek, which described the album as "fascinating [...] a curiously unshakable unity." Jim Miller of Rolling Stone decreed that it was "the most idiosyncratic — and flaky — record I have heard in some time, and it fascinates me."

== Post-release and The Beach Boys Love You ==
Other members of the band, including Carl and Dennis, disparaged the album in the press when it was released. Dennis felt that it was "a great mistake to put Brian in full control" and that the "whole process was a little bruising." He stated, "We were heartbroken. People have waited all this time, anticipating a new Beach Boys album, and I hated to give them this." Mike Love declined to comment on the album when asked by a reporter. In White's belief, the troubled sessions "precipitated the abrupt solo career decisions by Dennis and Carl Wilson", and what he had witnessed convinced him that "the greatest obstacle the Beach Boys face is that of five divergent personalities, fraught with jealousies, fears, foibles, conflicting interests and basic stylistic disagreements."

They couldn't function without me – they'd flounder, Their stage show is down pat, but they need me in the studio. [...] Everything I do is for the group. [...] Sometimes I really feel like a commodity in a stock market. [...] I've wanted to leave them lots of times.

— Brian Wilson, December 1976

In late 1976 interviews, Brian described 15 Big Ones as "nothing too deep" and promised that his next effort would be as ambitious as "Good Vibrations". He mentioned that he felt it was "a good album" and "if you listen to it, you can see where all the work went", adding that if it had been disliked by "the kids", then it "would have wrecked me and I'd probably have hidden out again." After touring with the band, he wrote material for what became the follow-up album The Beach Boys Love You (1977) intending it to be potentially a solo album that was "more creative, more original", and "lyrically much more interesting" than 15 Big Ones. In a 1998 interview, he referred to both as his favorite Beach Boys albums.

In 1978, Love recorded the original song "Brian's Back" as a response to the media campaign; the track was later released on the 1998 compilation Endless Harmony Soundtrack. Coinciding with the band's 2012 reunion, Capitol released a 50-track compilation of the Beach Boys' catalog titled Fifty Big Ones that included "It's O.K." and "Rock and Roll Music". "It's O.K." was rerecorded by Mike Love for his 2019 album 12 Sides of Summer and by Wilson for the 2021 documentary Brian Wilson: Long Promised Road. In 2025, 15 Big Ones outtakes and alternate mixes were included on We Gotta Groove: The Brother Studio Years, an expanded reissue of Love You. It marked the first release of the 15 Big Ones outtakes "Mony, Mony", "Running Bear", "Shake, Rattle and Roll", "Sea Cruise", and "Short Skirts".

== Legacy ==
Retrospective professional ratings
Review scores
Source	Rating
AllMusic	2.5/5 stars
Blender	3/5 stars
Christgau's Record Guide	B
Encyclopedia of Popular Music	3/5 stars
MusicHound	woof!
Pitchfork	1.5/10
The Rolling Stone Album Guide	2/5 stars

According to Christian Matijas-Mecca, 15 Big Ones marked the beginning of a one-and-a-half-year period in which "Brian produced some of his most creative and interesting (if not necessarily commercial) music since he abandoned SMiLE." In the view of journalist Brian Chidester, the album marked the end of "Wilson's full retreat as leader of the Beach Boys" without ever returning "to the form that saw him produce groundbreaking works like Pet Sounds and Smile."

In a retrospective review, The Village Voice critic Robert Christgau bemoaned the album's selection of covers and their lack of a "playful, goofy vocal intensity". Author Nick Kent called it "utterly uninspired and weary-sounding [...] clearly intended only as therapy for Wilson's long dormant production talents." Musician Dennis Diken of the Smithereens, who wrote the liner notes to the album's 2000 reissue, acknowledged its frequent points of criticisms and opined, "If you can accept all [of them] and put it behind you that this isn't Smile, Pet Sounds or even Wild Honey, give 15 Big Ones a spin and dig on what is a very cool and fun Beach Boys album."

Reviewing the album's 2000 reissue, Blender's Douglas Wolk wrote it suffered greatly from "clunky covers and bored performances". AllMusic's John Bush believed most of the covers were "simply too well known to be reworked effectively, by anyone", but favorably compared "It's OK" and "Had to Phone Ya" to "Brian's odd pop songs on late-'60s albums like Friends and 20/20." Pitchfork's Eric Kempfe described it as "muddy and confused" and highlighted "Had to Phone Ya" and "Back Home" as the best originals; Kempfe added that, with the exception of "Just Once in My Life", the covers "are notable only for the morbid fascination they hold [...] Brian's once-sweet falsetto is reduced to a hoarse crackle; as a result, Mike Love's painful nasal whine is the dominant voice on the record." In his 2007 book Icons of Rock, Scott Schinder called 15 Big Ones "largely a letdown, comprised largely of lackluster remakes of rock and roll oldies, along with a handful of lightweight but charming new songs by Brian.

Following the We Gotta Groove reissue of Love You, AllMusic's Tim Sendra wrote that the "songs intended for 15 Big Ones are a bit of a mixed bag" while Alexis Petridis of The Guardian referred to 15 Big Ones as "a hastily thrown-together mess" and felt that none of the included tracks drawn from its sessions "seem fit to cause anyone to reassess their views".

== Track listing ==
Side one
No.	Title	Writer(s)	Lead vocal(s)	Length
1.	"Rock and Roll Music"	Chuck Berry	Mike Love	2:29
2.	"It's O.K."	Brian Wilson, Mike Love	Love, Dennis Wilson	2:12
3.	"Had to Phone Ya"	Wilson, Love, Diane Rovell	Love, Al Jardine, D. Wilson, Carl Wilson, Brian Wilson	1:43
4.	"Chapel of Love"	Jeff Barry, Ellie Greenwich, Phil Spector	B. Wilson	2:34
5.	"Everyone's in Love with You"	Love	Love	2:42
6.	"Talk to Me"	Joe Seneca	C. Wilson	2:14
7.	"That Same Song"	Wilson, Love	B. Wilson	2:16
8.	"T M Song"	Wilson	Jardine	1:34

Side two
No.	Title	Writer(s)	Lead vocal(s)	Length
1.	"Palisades Park"	Chuck Barris	C. Wilson	2:27
2.	"Susie Cincinnati"	Al Jardine	Jardine	2:57
3.	"A Casual Look"	Ed Wells	Love, Jardine	2:45
4.	"Blueberry Hill"	Al Lewis, Larry Stock, Vincent Rose	Love	3:01
5.	"Back Home"	Wilson, Bob Norberg	B. Wilson	2:49
6.	"In the Still of the Night"	Fred Parris	D. Wilson	3:03
7.	"Just Once in My Life"	Gerry Goffin, Carole King, Spector	C. Wilson, B. Wilson	3:47
Total length:				39:20

Note

- "Talk to Me" includes an interpolation of the 1959 song "Tallahassee Lassie", originally performed by Freddy Cannon.

== Personnel ==
Credits taken from the album's liner notes.

The Beach Boys

- Alan Jardine – lead (3, 8, 10–11) and backing vocals (all tracks), guitar (10)
- Michael Love – lead (1–3, 5, 11–12) and backing vocals (all tracks), arranger (2, 5)
- Brian Wilson – lead (3–4, 7, 13) and backing vocals (all tracks except 5), piano (1–4, 6–7, 9, 11, 14–15), organ (1–2, 6–9, 12–13, 15), Moog bass (1–2, 4, 6, 13–15), ARP synthesizer (1), ARP String Ensemble (4–5, 14–15), bass guitar (10), harmonica (10), chimes (12), bells (13), arranger (1–3, 6–15)
- Carl Wilson – lead (3, 6, 9, 15) and backing vocals (1–3, 5–7, 9–15), guitars (2, 4–5, 10, 12–13), bass (5–6, 11), synthesizer (9), Jew's harp (13), percussion (13, 15)
- Dennis Wilson – lead (3, 14) and backing vocals (1–3, 6, 10, 12, 14), drums (1–8, 11, 13–15), percussion (11), vibraphone (8)

Touring members

- Ron Altbach – piano (5), harpsichord (5), accordion (7)
- Ed Carter – guitar (1, 3, 5–8, 11, 15)
- Billy Hinsche – guitar (1, 3, 6, 8, 11, 15)

Guests

- Daryl Dragon – clavinet (10), vocal arrangement (5)
- Dennis Dragon – drums (10)
- Ricky Fataar – drums (2), percussion (15)
- Bruce Johnston – backing vocals (10, 15), piano (12)
- Charles Lloyd – flute (5)
- Toni Tennille – backing vocals (5)
- Marilyn Wilson – backing vocals (1–3, 7)
- Roy Wood (credited as "Roy Wood and Wizzard") – saxophone (2)

Additional session musicians

- Mike Altschul – saxophone (1, 4), clarinet (1)
- Ben Benay – guitar (9)
- Hal Blaine – drums (9, 12)
- Jerry Cole – guitar (9)
- Steve Douglas – saxophone (1, 3–9, 12), horns (11), flute (8)
- Dennis Dreith – saxophone (1, 4), clarinet (1–3)
- Tim Drummond – bass (7)
- Gene Estes – percussion (6)
- Carl L. Fortina – accordion (9, 12)
- Jim Hughart – string bass (12)
- Jules Jacobs – clarinet (2–3)
- Plas Johnson – saxophone (9)
- Jackie Kelso – saxophone (1, 4), clarinet (1)
- Jack Nimitz – saxophone (1, 4), clarinet (1)
- Jay Migliori – saxophone (5–8), horns (11), flute (8)
- Carol Lee Miller – autoharp (1, 4)
- Ray Pohlman – bass (9)
- Lyle Ritz – bass (3, 9)
- Bobby Shew – trumpet (3)
- Tommy Tedesco – guitar (12)
- Julius Wechter – percussion (9), bells (9, 12)
- Maureen L. West – harp (5)

The Sid Sharp Strings (3, 6–7)

- Murray Adler – violin (7)
- Arnold Belnick – violin (3)
- Henry Ferber – violin (3)
- Lori Klass – violin (7)
- Lou Klass – violin (6)
- Bernard Kundell – violin (6)
- William Kurasch – violin (7)
- James Getzoff – violin (6)
- Henry L. Roth – violin (6)
- Sidney Sharp – violin (3, 7)
- Tibor Zelig – violin (7)

Technical

- Dean Torrence and Jim Evans – album cover, art direction and logo

== Charts ==
Chart (1976)	Peak position
UK Top 40 Album Chart	31
US Billboard Top LPs & Tape	8

== Bibliography ==
- Abbott, Kingsley, ed. (1997). Back to the Beach: A Brian Wilson and the Beach Boys Reader. Helter Skelter. ISBN 978-1-90092-402-3.
- Badman, Keith (2004). The Beach Boys: The Definitive Diary of America's Greatest Band, on Stage and in the Studio. Backbeat Books. ISBN 978-0-87930-818-6.
- Carlin, Peter Ames (2006). Catch a Wave: The Rise, Fall, and Redemption of the Beach Boys' Brian Wilson. Rodale. ISBN 978-1-59486-320-2. Archived from the original on February 22, 2017.
- Dillon, Mark (2012). Fifty Sides of the Beach Boys: The Songs That Tell Their Story. ECW Press. ISBN 978-1-77090-198-8.
- Gaines, Steven (1986). Heroes and Villains: The True Story of The Beach Boys. New York: Da Capo Press. ISBN 0306806479.
- Kent, Nick (2009). "The Last Beach Movie Revisited: The Life of Brian Wilson". The Dark Stuff: Selected Writings on Rock Music. Da Capo Press. ISBN 9780786730742. Archived from the original on December 27, 2021.
- Lambert, Philip (2007). Inside the Music of Brian Wilson: the Songs, Sounds, and Influences of the Beach Boys' Founding Genius. Continuum. ISBN 978-0-8264-1876-0. Archived from the original on May 15, 2016.
- Leaf, David (1978). The Beach Boys and the California Myth. New York: Grosset & Dunlap. ISBN 978-0-448-14626-3.
- Love, Mike (2016). Good Vibrations: My Life as a Beach Boy. Penguin Publishing Group. ISBN 978-0-698-40886-9. Archived from the original on August 12, 2020.
- Matijas-Mecca, Christian (2017). The Words and Music of Brian Wilson. ABC-CLIO. ISBN 978-1-4408-3899-6. Archived from the original on April 21, 2021.
- Preiss, Byron (1979). The Beach Boys. Ballantine Books. ISBN 978-0-345-27398-7. Archived from the original on July 27, 2020.
- Sanchez, Luis (2014). The Beach Boys' Smile. Bloomsbury Publishing. ISBN 978-1-62356-956-3. Archived from the original on August 18, 2021.
- Schinder, Scott (2007). "The Beach Boys". In Schinder, Scott; Schwartz, Andy (eds.). Icons of Rock: An Encyclopedia of the Legends Who Changed Music Forever. Greenwood Press. ISBN 978-0313338458. Archived from the original on May 13, 2016.
- White, Timothy (1996). The Nearest Faraway Place: Brian Wilson, the Beach Boys, and the Southern Californian Experience. Macmillan. ISBN 0333649370.
- Wilson, Brian; Greenman, Ben (2016). I Am Brian Wilson: A Memoir. Da Capo Press. ISBN 978-0-306-82307-7. Archived from the original on July 26, 2020.
