= The Beach Boys: It's OK! =

1976 television special

- Written by: Dan Aykroyd; John Belushi; Lorne Michaels; Alan Zweibel
- Directed by: Gary Weis
- Starring: Brian Wilson; Carl Wilson; Dennis Wilson; Mike Love; Al Jardine
- Composer: The Beach Boys
- Country of origin: United States
- Original language: English

Production
- Producers: Lorne Michaels; Craig Kellem
- Cinematography: James Signorelli
- Editors: Susan Martin; Sharon Sachs; Aviva Slesin
- Running time: 50 minutes
- Production companies: Above Average Productions; Beach Boys Productions

Original release
- Network: NBC
- Release: August 5, 1976

The Beach Boys (also known as The Beach Boys: It's OK) is a 1976 television special about the Beach Boys that was directed by Gary Weis. The program originally aired on NBC on August 5, 1976.

== Synopsis ==
The special includes performances from a live Beach Boys concert intertwined with other footage, including Carl Wilson flying a plane and Dennis Wilson judging a beauty pageant. Brian Wilson is interviewed from bed about his career. Brian is later shown performing "I'm Bugged at My Ol' Man" in the studio with Carl and Dennis. Van Dyke Parks talks about his collaborations with the Beach Boys. The group is shown performing "That Same Song" at the Double Rock Baptist Church with its choir. Dan Aykroyd and John Belushi play two policemen who drag Brian out of bed to take him surfing.

== Production ==
In the 1986 book Heroes and Villains: The True Story of the Beach Boys, author Steven Gaines attributed the impetus of the special to Dennis Wilson. According to Lorne Michaels, the special was "done on film and in documentary style". In another interview, Michaels noted that the production crew tried to avoid a "canned" look by shooting on location wherever possible. The sequence where Brian Wilson is forced to go surfing was filmed on his 34th birthday, June 20, 1976 in Trancas. The concert sequences were filmed on July 3 in Anaheim, California.

Gaines claimed that Michaels signed a "quasi-censorship agreement" with Brian's psychologist Eugene Landy, permitting Landy to supervise and approve scenes with Brian during production of the special.

== Songs ==
1. "Fun, Fun, Fun"
2. "Be True to Your School"
3. "I'm Bugged at My Ol' Man" (in studio)
4. "God Only Knows"
5. "I Get Around"
6. "You Are So Beautiful"
7. "That Same Song" (with the Double Rock Baptist Choir)
8. "Good Vibrations" (rehearsal/live footage)
9. "Sloop John B"
10. "Surfin' U.S.A."
11. "California Girls"
12. "Help Me, Rhonda"
13. "It's OK"
14. "Rock and Roll Music"
15. "Wouldn't It Be Nice" (end credits)

== Broadcast and critical reception ==
The original broadcast was sponsored by Dr Pepper, which also funded the special. According to Record World, the program received a 10.5/22 rating and was watched by 7.5 million households. Marc Kirkeby noted that the program "may have seemed too daring to an older audience".

Jay Sharbutt of Associated Press gave a positive review of the special, noting "This might strike a few viewers as weird, but it makes for enjoyable looking and listening".

=== Home media ===
On June 18, 2013, the special was released on DVD by Eagle Rock Entertainment as The Beach Boys: Good Vibrations Tour.
