= Almost Summer (album) =

Studio album / soundtrack album by Celebration
- Released: May 8, 1978
- Genre: Pop rock
- Length: 34:55
- Label: MCA

Celebration chronology
Almost Summer (1978)	Celebration (1979)

Singles from Almost Summer
- 1. "Almost Summer" Released: 1978; 2. "It's O.K." Released: 1978; 3. "Summer in the City" Released: 1978

Almost Summer is the debut studio album and a soundtrack album by American rock band Celebration, fronted by Mike Love. It was released on May 8, 1978, through MCA Records. The album was released in support of the motion picture of the same name, and included the band's only charting single "Almost Summer" (which reached #28 on the Billboard Hot 100) co-written by Love's Beach Boys bandmates Al Jardine and Brian Wilson.

== Track listing ==
No.	Title	Writer(s)	Length
1.	"Almost Summer"	Brian Wilson, Mike Love, Al Jardine	2:40
2.	"Sad Sad Summer"	Love	3:44
3.	"Cruisin'"	Love	2:10
4.	"Lookin' Good"	Ron Altbach	2:05
5.	"Summer in the City"	John Sebastian, Mark Sebastian, Steve Boone	3:00
6.	"It's O.K."	Wilson, Love	2:18
7.	"Football"	Charles Lloyd, Altbach	1:32
8.	"Island Girl"	Lloyd	7:24
9.	"Christine and Bobby"	Altbach	3:47
10.	"We Are the Future" (performed by High Inergy)	Laws, Holiday, Bolton, Womack	3:42
11.	"She Was a Lady" (performed by Fresh)	Bill Pratt	2:35
Total length:			34:55

== Personnel ==
- Mike Love – lead vocals (1, 2, 3)
- Charles Lloyd – saxophone, flute
- Ron Altbach – keyboards
- Dave "Doc" Robinson – backing vocals, bass, lead vocals (5, 6)
- Paul Fauerso – vocals, keyboards
- Mike Kowalski – drums, percussion
- Ed Carter – guitar
- Wells Kelly – bass
- Gary Griffin – keyboards

Additional musicians

- Steve Douglas – saxophone
- Rusty Ford – bass
- Tom Smith – drums
- Sterling Smith – synthesizers
- Ed Tuleja – guitars
- Dave Bunch – guitars
- Maureen Love – harp
