= The Elgins (disambiguation) =

The Elgins were a 1960s Motown group.

The Elgins may also refer to:

- The Elgins, a 1960s Flip Records group
- Another Motown group later known as The Temptations
- Short title for the Canadian 31st Combat Engineer Regiment
