= The Punisher (1989 score) =

The Punisher: Original Motion Picture Score

Film score by Dennis Dreith
- Released: July 19, 2005
- Recorded: April 4, 1989
- Genres: Orchestral; Film score
- Length: 79:22
- Labels: Perseverance Records; Tarantula Records
- Producers: Dennis Dreith and Robin Esterhammer

Dennis Dreith chronology
Purple People Eater (score)	The Punisher: Original Motion Picture Score	Gag (score)

Professional ratings
Review scores
Source	Rating
Monsters and Critics	2/5 stars
AllMusic	3.5/5 stars
Rate Your Music	3/5 stars

The Punisher: Original Motion Picture Score is the score to the 1989 film of the same name. The album was composed, orchestrated and conducted by Dennis Dreith. It was released on July 19, 2005 on CD, it also features a 23 minutes interview with composer Dreith and the director Mark Goldblatt. The interview focuses not only on the music itself but also much about the ill-fated circumstances which concerned the release of the original film.

== Track listing ==
Track listing
No.	Title	Length
1.	"Main Title"	2:20
2.	"Follow Dino"	0:18
3.	"Welcome Home Dino"	1:14
4.	"Dino Bites the Dust"	0:26
5.	"Praying For A Flashback"	1:05
6.	"Perfectly Frank"	0:24
7.	"Harbor Shoot-em-up"	4:24
8.	"Punisher M.D."	0:48
9.	"Tanaka Meets Franco"	1:13
10.	"Tanaka and The Punisher"	1:07
11.	"Suffer The Children"	1:25
12.	"Path to Tanaka"	0:34
13.	"Chopin"	1:02
14.	"Party Pooping Punisher"	1:52
15.	"The Pier"	1:39
16.	"The Funhouse"	0:51
17.	"Funhouse Shoot Out"	2:34
18.	"Pretty Poison"	1:53
19.	"Harbor Aftermath"	1:41
20.	"The Mission"	1:03
21.	"Armored Car"	0:41
22.	"Choose Your Weapon"	0:56
23.	"Bullet Proof Bus"	4:51
24.	"Mini Nightmare"	0:32
25.	"Class Dismissed"	2:21
26.	"Wake Up"	1:46
27.	"Pain In The Neck (Tanaka's Last Stand)"	3:53
28.	"Goodbye Castle"	3:51
29.	"Punisher Signature"	0:36
30.	"End Title"	4:22
31.	""Planet of Love"" (Song written for the film by Harry Garfield and Simon Stokes)	4:37
Total length:		56:30

=== Bonus ===
Including an interview with composer Dennis Dreith and director Mark Goldblatt.

Track listing
No.	Title	Length
1.	"Getting the Job"	6:47
2.	"Spotting"	1:09
3.	"Scoring Scenes"	4:31
4.	"Orchestration"	1:48
5.	"Scoring Session"	2:37
6.	"Editing Musically"	3:00
7.	"Soundtrack/ Distribution"	2:39
8.	"Sign-Off"	0:16
Total length:		22:58

== Production ==
Harry Garfield also produced another song Vicious Mind, which is not included on the disc.

== Release ==
Despite the film being from 1989 the score was not officially released before 2005. Dennis Dreith, the composer, has expressed relief that it has finally been released.

"Resurrecting the score from the original safety masters was most gratifying. It's really great to hear the score again after all these years in it's [sic] full glory, especially since the only copy previously available was the mono home video release. Now with the release of the CD, the score can finally be heard the way we intended it." [...] I owe a debt of gratitude to Robin Esterhammer and Perseverance Records for bringing this score back to life. Connecting again with Mark Goldblatt to do the audio interview on this collectors CD was a real added treat."

== Reception ==
William Ruhlmann of AllMusic expressed that the score is not a lost classic but that it is worthwhile for anyone who enjoys the movie, and that it is nonetheless seen as superior to that of the subsequent 2004 film by most critics.

"Dreith, like other composers for action movies before him, has the opportunity to write for a variety of moods, from calm, if ominous, cues like "Tanaka Meets Franco" to stirring martial passages such as those found in "Funhouse Shootout," and even to sneak in some chamber music ("Chopin"). The presence of a major Oriental character, Madame Tanaka, justifies the use of Japanese-sounding percussion, especially in the later parts of the score."
