= Everyone's in Love with You =

Single by The Beach Boys

from the album 15 Big Ones
- A-side: "Susie Cincinnati"
- Released: November 8, 1976
- Genre: Rock
- Length: 2:42
- Label: Brother Records
- Songwriter: Mike Love
- Producer: Brian Wilson

The Beach Boys singles chronology
"It's O.K." (1976)	"Everyone's in Love with You" (1976)	"Honkin' Down the Highway" (1977)

"Everyone's in Love with You" is a song written by Mike Love for the American rock band The Beach Boys. It was released in 1976 on their album 15 Big Ones and as the b-side of the single "Susie Cincinnati." The subject of this song refers to the Maharishi. The song was later re-recorded for Mike Love's 2023 Mike Love Not War album. The song was also played live by the Mike Love and Bruce Johnston led Beach Boys during their 2004 European tour.

== Personnel ==
Personnel per 2000 liner notes.

The Beach Boys

- Al Jardine – backing vocals
- Mike Love – lead vocals, backing vocals
- Brian Wilson – ARP Solina String Ensemble
- Carl Wilson – backing vocals, bass, guitar
- Dennis Wilson – drums

Additional musicians

- Daryl Dragon – vocal arrangements
- Ron Altbach – piano, harpsichord
- Ed Carter – guitar
- Steve Douglas – saxophone
- Charles Lloyd – flute
- Jay Migliori – saxophone
- Toni Tennille – backing vocals
- Maureen L. West – harp
