= Hedgpeth =

Hedgpeth is a surname, and may refer to:

- Harry Hedgpeth (1888–1966), Major League Baseball pitcher
- Joel Hedgpeth (1911–2006), American marine biologist
- Kim Roberts Hedgpeth, American lawyer and director of the American Federation of Television and Radio Artists

== See also ==
- Hedgpeth Festival, 2006 music festival
- Hedgpeth Heights, mountains in Antarctica
- Hedgepeth
