= Gettin' Hungry =

1967 single by Brian Wilson & Mike Love/the Beach Boys

- Dutch picture sleeve

Single by Brian Wilson & Mike Love

from the album Smiley Smile
- B-side: "Devoted to You"
- Released: August 28, 1967
- Recorded: July 14, 1967
- Studio: Beach Boys (Los Angeles)
- Genre: R&B; soul
- Length: 2:25
- Label: Brother/Capitol
- Songwriters: Brian Wilson, Mike Love
- Producer: The Beach Boys

Brian Wilson singles chronology
"Caroline, No" (1966)	"Gettin' Hungry" (1967)	"Let's Go to Heaven in My Car" (1987)

Mike Love singles chronology
"Gettin' Hungry" (1967)	"Lookin' Back with Love" (1981)

Licensed audio
- "Gettin' Hungry" on YouTube

"Gettin' Hungry" is a song by the American rock band the Beach Boys from their 1967 album Smiley Smile. Credited on the label to Brian Wilson and Mike Love, it was released as a single on August 28, 1967, the second and last released on the original iteration of Brother Records.

== Background ==
Asked for comment, Wilson said that he "just thought it would be a good single". It is one of the few songs on Smiley Smile that lack a definite connection to the aborted Smile project.

== Recording ==
"Gettin' Hungry" was recorded at Brian Wilson's Bellagio home studio on July 14, 1967.

== Reception ==
Billboard reviewed "Gettin' Hungry" as an "unusual piece of material — as off-beat as their current 'Heroes and Villains' smash. Should prove to be an important chart item." Cash Box said that the "use of abrupt changes of speed, overwhelming organ atmosphere and the sort of 'soul' sound that is Beach Boys" make the song "distinctive."

Among biographers, Byron Preiss characterized it as "an odd combination of energetic chorus, electric bass, and bluesy meandering". Mark Dillon noted the song as a "flop single".

== Cover versions ==
- 1979 – Celebration, Celebration
- 1974 – Faces
- 2012 – Keith Haman - from the album Total Electric
- 2013 – Seth Mankowski, Portland Sings The Beach Boys "Smiley Smile"
