= Flip Records =

Flip Records may refer to:

- Flip Records (1950s)
- Flip Records (1994)

== See also ==
- List of record labels
