= Cyclone Raymond =

Studio album by Mental As Anything
- Released: 18 September 1989
- Recorded: 1987–1989
- Genre: Pop, rock
- Length: 46:09
- Label: CBS Records
- Producer: Steve James, Mark Moffatt, Mark Opitz, Robyn Smith

Mental As Anything chronology
Mouth to Mouth (1987)	Cyclone Raymond (1989)	Chemical Travel (1993)

Singles from Cyclone Raymond
- 1. "Love Comes Running" Released: April 1989; 2. "The World Seems Difficult" Released: August 1989; 3. "Baby You're Wild" Released: November 1989; 4. "Overwhelmed" Released: February 1990

Professional ratings
Review scores
Source	Rating
AllMusic	4.5/5 stars

Cyclone Raymond is the seventh studio album by Australian pop rock band Mental As Anything, released in September 1989 by CBS / Columbia. It peaked at number 34 on the ARIA Charts.

== Reception ==
Trouser Press said of the album "Some people just don't heed the warning signs of encroaching blandness. Cyclone Raymond is completely boring, a collection of tepid love songs that couldn't possibly please anyone other than a soft-rock radio programmer anxious to fill air time with anything inoffensively presentable."

== Track listing ==
No.	Title	Writer(s)	Producer(s)	Length
1.	"Big Things in Life"	Reg Mombassa	Steve James; Mark Moffatt	2:49
2.	"Overwhelmed"	Greedy Smith	Steve James; Mark Moffatt	4:00
3.	"The Walls of the World"	Reg Mombassa	Steve James; Mark Moffatt	3:22
4.	"Some Feelings"	Martin Plaza	Robyn Smith	4:12
5.	"Monster on the Playground"	Greedy Smith	Steve James; Mark Moffatt	4:21
6.	"Rock and Roll Music"	Chuck Berry	Steve James	3:02
7.	"Baby You're Wild"	Peter O'Doherty	Steve James; Mark Moffatt	3:18
8.	"The World Seems Difficult"	Greedy Smith	Mark Opitz	4:14
9.	"Love Comes Running"	Peter O'Doherty	Mark Opitz	3:47
10.	"In the Sunshine"	Martin Plaza	Steve James; Mark Moffatt	4:59
11.	"Get You Back"	Martin Plaza	Steve James; Mark Moffatt	3:03
12.	"Oasis"	Reg Mombassa	Steve James; Mark Moffatt	5:02

== Personnel ==
=== Musicians ===
- Martin Plaza — lead vocals, guitar
- Greedy Smith — lead vocals, keyboards, harmonica
- Reg Mombassa — guitar, vocals
- Peter O'Doherty — bass, guitar, vocals
- Wayne de Lisle — drums

== Charts ==
Chart (1989)	Peak position
Australian Albums (ARIA)	34
