= It's OK (The Beach Boys song) =

Single by the Beach Boys

from the album 15 Big Ones
- B-side: "Had to Phone Ya"
- Released: August 9, 1976
- Recorded: 1974–1976
- Genre: Rock
- Length: 2:12
- Label: Brother/Reprise
- Songwriters: Brian Wilson, Mike Love
- Producer: Brian Wilson

The Beach Boys singles chronology
"Rock and Roll Music" (1976)	"It's OK" (1976)	"Susie Cincinnati" (1976)

Licensed audio
- "It's OK" on YouTube

"It's OK" (spelled "It's O.K." on the record label) is a song by the American rock band the Beach Boys from their 1976 album 15 Big Ones. Written by Brian Wilson and Mike Love, it is an upbeat song about celebrating summer fun. It was issued as a single on August 9, 1976 (with the B-side "Had to Phone Ya") and reached number 29 on the Billboard Hot 100. The single version is slightly sped-up compared to the album version.

== Background and recording ==
"It's OK" is an upbeat song about celebrating summer fun that was written by Brian Wilson and Mike Love. Brian commented of the song in a 1995 interview, "That was written inside Brother Studios in Santa Monica. At the end, where Dennis goes (sings) 'Find a ride', we put two of his voices on there, and it sounded fan-tas-tic! Fuckin' fantastic from Dennis." On another occasion, he praised Love's lyrics, but said that the song "doesn't bring back real pleasant memories."

Sessions for the song commenced at Brother Studios in October 1974, notably featuring members of Wizzard who were staying in Los Angeles at the end of their only U.S. tour. Contrary to the credits on the back of the 15 Big Ones album, bandleader Roy Wood played drums, not saxophone.

== Legacy ==
In the United States, the song was the highest-charting original single that the Beach Boys released between "Do It Again" (which peaked at number 20 in 1968) and "Getcha Back" (which peaked at number 26 in 1985); however, "Almost Summer" (a song written by Wilson, Love, and Al Jardine for the sidegroup Celebration) reached number 28 in 1978, while "The Beach Boys Medley" (which also interpolates the band's 1965 cover of "Barbara Ann") peaked at number 12 in 1981. "It's O.K." later reappeared as the B-side to the 1985 single "It's Gettin' Late".

Record World said that "it works remarkably well" and called it a "summer celebration as only [the Beach Boys] know how to produce."

In 2019, Love re-recorded "It's O.K." for his album 12 Sides of Summer. Brian Wilson also re-recorded the track for the soundtrack to the documentary Brian Wilson: Long Promised Road (2021).

== Personnel ==
Per 2000 liner notes and Dillon.

The Beach Boys

- Al Jardine – backing vocals
- Mike Love – lead and backing vocals
- Brian Wilson – backing vocals, piano, organ, Moog bass
- Carl Wilson – backing vocals, guitar
- Dennis Wilson – backing vocals, drums
- Ricky Fataar – drums

Additional musicians and production staff

- Dennis Dreith – clarinet
- Jules Jacobs – clarinet
- Marilyn Wilson – backing vocals
- Roy Wood – drums
- Mike Burney – saxophone
- Nick Pentelow – saxophone
