= Celebration (1979 album) =

Studio album by Celebration
- Released: February 21, 1979
- Genre: Pop rock
- Length: 34:10
- Label: Pacific Arts

Celebration chronology
Almost Summer: Music from the Original Motion Picture Score (1978)	Celebration (1979)	Disco Celebration (1979)

Celebration is the self-titled second album release by the Mike Love fronted band Celebration. The album was released in February 1979 and mainly features song writing from Mike Love and Ron Altbach. The album also contains a Brian Wilson co-written song called "How’s About A Little Bit". "Starbaby" and "Gettin' Hungry" were released as the lead singles for album. "Gettin' Hungry" was a cover of a Beach Boys track from 1967. The album was only released on LP and is currently out of print. It is estimated only 5,000 copies were pressed and released.

== Track listing ==
1. "Gettin’ Hungry" (Brian Wilson/Mike Love) – 4:30
2. "Sailor" (Dave Robinson/Ron Altbach) – 3:07
3. "Lovestruck" (Ed Tuleja/Altbach) – 3:26
4. "She’s Just Out to Get You" (Love) – 3:12
5. "I Don’t Wanna Know" (Love) – 3:31
6. "Starbaby" (Love) – 4:32
7. "Go and Get That Girl" (Tuleja/Altbach) – 3:06
8. "How’s About a Little Bit" (Wilson/Diane Rovell/Love/Altbach) – 2:34
9. "Song of Creation" (Robinson/Altbach) – 2:58
10. "Country Pie" (Tuleja/Altbach) – 3:16

== Personnel ==
- Mike Love — lead vocals (tracks 1, 4, 8, 10) backing vocals
- Dave "Doc" Robinson — lead vocals (tracks 2, 3, 5, 7, 9), backing vocals
- Gary Griffin — backing vocals
- Irene Cathaway — backing vocals
- Linda Mallah — backing vocals
- Steve Leach — backing vocals
- Suzanne Wallach — backing vocals
- Charles Lloyd — saxophone
- Tim Weston — guitars; guitar solo (tracks 1, 2, 5)
- Al Perkins — guitar solo (tracks 3, 10)
- Paul Fauerso — organ, backing vocals; lead vocals (track 6)
- Ron Altbach — piano, backing vocals, electric piano, production
- Kevin Brandon — bass
- Kim Calkins — drums
