= The World Seems Difficult =

Single by Mental As Anything

from the album Cyclone Raymond
- B-side: "Get You Back"
- Released: 1989
- Genre: Rock
- Length: 4:14
- Label: CBS Records
- Songwriter: Greedy Smith
- Producers: Mark Opitz, Steve James

Mental As Anything singles chronology
"Love Comes Running" (1989)	"The World Seems Difficult" (1989)	"Baby You're Wild" (1989)

"The World Seems Difficult" is a single by Australian band Mental As Anything, released in 1989. It was released as the first single from the album Cyclone Raymond. The song charted at number 19 on the ARIA Charts and it stayed on the charts for 9 weeks.

== Composition ==
Greedy Smith composed the song soon after returning from the United Kingdom, while staying at a motel in Gulgong, near Mudgee, on the first night of the band's tour. He said it "was a bit different for us - nobody knew who it was, basically." He added, "You've got to do these things occasionally because you always run a risk of copying yourself."

== Music video ==
A music video was shot at Slaughterhouse Studios in Redfern, New South Wales. It was directed by Kriv Stenders. It was originally filmed in slow-motion at 50 frames per second.

== Reception ==
Lynden Barber of the Sydney Morning Herald said about the song, "I would have picked on a blindfold test as A-Ha."

The song appears over the opening credits of the film The Big Steal (1990).

== Personnel ==
- Martin Plaza — guitar
- Greedy Smith — lead vocals, keyboards, harmonica
- Reg Mombassa — guitar, vocals
- Peter O'Doherty — bass, guitar, vocals
- Wayne de Lisle – drums

== Track listings ==
No.	Title	Writer(s)	Length
1.	"The World Seems Difficult"	Greedy Smith	4:14
2.	"Get You Back"	Martin Plaza

== Charts ==
Chart (1989)	Peak position
Australia (ARIA Charts)	19
