= Rock and Roll Music (song) =

1957 song by Chuck Berry

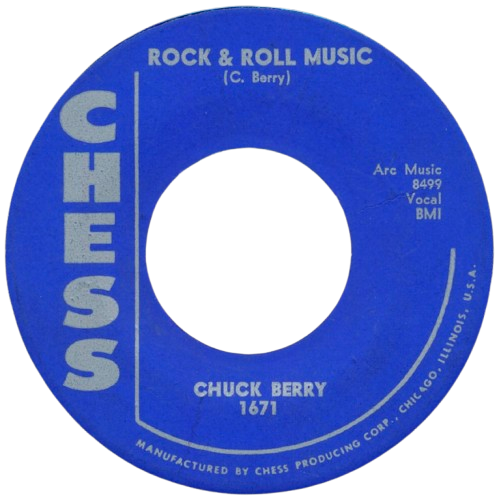
- U.S. A-side label

Single by Chuck Berry
- B-side: "Blue Feeling"
- Released: September 1957
- Recorded: May 1957
- Studio: Chess (Chicago)
- Genre: Rock and roll
- Length: 2:30
- Label: Chess
- Songwriter: Chuck Berry
- Producers: Leonard Chess, Phil Chess

Chuck Berry singles chronology
"Oh Baby Doll" (1957)	"Rock and Roll Music" (1957)	"Sweet Little Sixteen" (1958)

"Rock and Roll Music" is a song by American musician and songwriter Chuck Berry, written and recorded by Berry in May 1957. It has been widely covered and is one of Berry's most popular and enduring compositions.

"Rock and Roll Music" was met with instant success, reaching the top 10 in the United States. The Beatles' 1964 recording topped singles charts in Europe and in Australia, and the Beach Boys had a U.S. top 10 hit with the song in 1976.

== Original song ==
The sessions for "Rock and Roll Music" took place in May 1957 in Chicago. The session was produced by Leonard Chess and Phil Chess. Backing Berry were Lafayette Leake (piano), Willie Dixon (bass), and Fred Below (drums). Chess records issued the song as a single in September 1957 on both the 45 and 78 rpm formats. It reached number six on Billboard magazine's R&B Singles chart and number eight on Hot 100 chart before the year's end.

In 2004, Rolling Stone magazine ranked Berry's version number 128 on its list of the "500 Greatest Songs of All Time". The song is also included in the Rock and Roll Hall of Fame's list of the "500 Songs That Shaped Rock and Roll".

== The Beatles version ==
"Rock and Roll Music"
- Belgian single picture sleeve (1965)

Song by the Beatles

from the album Beatles for Sale
- Released: December 4, 1964 (UK: Beatles for Sale); December 15, 1964 (US: Beatles '65)
- Recorded: October 18, 1964
- Studio: EMI, London
- Genre: Rock and roll
- Length: 2:30 (misprinted as 2:02 on Beatles '65)
- Label: Parlophone (UK); Capitol (US)
- Songwriter: Chuck Berry
- Producer: George Martin

The Beatles performed the song in many of their early Hamburg shows, and also played it on the BBC program Pop Go the Beatles. In late 1964, with limited time to record a new album before embarking on a UK tour, in addition to original material, they recorded several covers of their rock and rhythm & blues favorites to fill out their next LP release Beatles for Sale, which was due out in December in time for Christmas.

John Lennon provided the vocal, employing more dynamics in contrast to Berry's original, even-toned rendition. In the U.S., it was released on the LP Beatles '65. The song was played during the group's final tour in 1966, and the performance from their show of June 30 at the Nippon Budokan was included in 1996's Anthology 2 – and was also performed during the Get Back/Let It Be Sessions in January 1969. It also served as the title song to the Beatles' 1976 compilation album Rock 'n' Roll Music.

Credits for the piano vary. The original Beatles for Sale liner notes, by Derek Taylor, state that "George Martin joins John and Paul on one piano", implying an overdub by all three that was added after the basic take. In the 1988 book The Complete Beatles Recording Sessions, Mark Lewisohn described the recording as a single take with no overdubs, with "all The Beatles on their familiar instruments" and Martin on piano. On the other hand, Geoff Emerick recalls that the song was recorded with McCartney on piano and George Harrison on bass.

In some countries, "Rock and Roll Music" was released as a single, with "I'm a Loser" as the B-side, in early 1965. It topped the charts in Norway, Sweden, Finland and Australia. The single peaked at number two in Germany and the Netherlands, and number three in Belgium.

=== Personnel ===
- John Lennon – vocals, rhythm guitar, piano
- Paul McCartney – bass guitar, piano
- George Harrison – lead guitar
- Ringo Starr – drums
- George Martin – piano, producer

=== Charts ===
Chart (1965)	Peak position
Austria (Ö3 Austria Top 40)	4
Belgium (Ultratop 50 Flanders)	3
Belgium (Ultratop 50 Wallonia)	6
Italy (Musica e dischi)	36
Netherlands (Single Top 100)	2
Norway (VG-lista)	1
West Germany (Media Control)	2

== The Beach Boys version ==
"Rock and Roll Music"

Single by the Beach Boys

from the album 15 Big Ones
- B-side: "T M Song"
- Released: May 24, 1976
- Recorded: 1976
- Genre: Rock and roll
- Length: 2:29
- Label: Brother/Reprise
- Songwriter: Chuck Berry
- Producer: Brian Wilson

The Beach Boys singles chronology
"Sail On, Sailor" (1975)	"Rock and Roll Music" (1976)	"It's O.K." (1976)

The Beach Boys' version includes the use of backing vocals which repeat the phrase "Rock, roll, rockin' and rollin’.” There is a difference between the LP version and the single version in that the single version has more synthesizer. Their version reached No. 5 on the US chart and No. 11 in Canada during the summer of 1976.

=== Personnel ===
Personnel per 2000 liner notes.

The Beach Boys

- Al Jardine – backing vocals
- Mike Love – backing vocals, lead vocals
- Brian Wilson – backing vocals, arranger, piano, Moog bass, ARP synthesizer
- Carl Wilson – backing vocals
- Dennis Wilson – backing vocals, drums

Additional musicians and production staff

- Marilyn Wilson – backing vocals
- Ed Carter – guitar
- Billy Hinsche – guitar
- Gene Estes – percussion
- Carol Lee Miller – autoharp
- Steve Douglas – saxophone
- Dennis Dreith – saxophone, clarinet
- Mike Altschul – saxophone, clarinet
- John J. Kelson, Jr. – saxophone, clarinet
- Jack Nimitz – saxophone, clarinet

Album cover, art direction and logo was done by Dean Torrence and Jim Evans.

=== Charts ===
Weekly charts

Chart (1976)	Peak position
Canada RPM Top Singles	11
UK Singles Chart	36
US Billboard Hot 100	5
US Cash Box Top 100	11

Year-end charts

Chart (1976)	Rank
Canada	112
US Billboard Hot 100	62

== Mental As Anything version ==
"Rock and Roll Music"

Single by Mental As Anything

from the album Cyclone Raymond
- B-side: "Secret Life (Aus); Get You Back (UK)"
- Released: November 1988
- Recorded: World Expo '88
- Genre: Rock
- Length: 3:00; 4:50 (Extended mix)
- Label: CBS Records (Aus); Epic Records (UK); Columbia Records (US)
- Songwriter: Chuck Berry
- Producer: Steve James

Mental As Anything singles chronology
"If You Leave Me, Can I Come Too?" (1988)	"Rock and Roll Music" (1988)	"Love Comes Running" (1988)

Australian band Mental As Anything covered the song Rock and Roll Music. It was released as the first single from the band's seventh studio album Cyclone Raymond. The song was released in November 1988 and charted at number 5 on the Kent Music Report and it stayed on the chart for 22 weeks.

=== Track listings ===
CBS (653122 7)
No.	Title	Writer(s)	Length
1.	"Rock and Roll Music"	Chuck Berry	3:00
2.	"Apocalypso (Live)"	Martin Plaza, Reg Mombassa	4:46

12" version
No.	Title	Writer(s)	Length
1.	"Rock and Roll Music (Extended Mix)"	Chuck Berry	4:50
2.	"Apocalypso (Live)"	Martin Plaza, Reg Mombassa	4:46
3.	"Secret Life (Live)"	Martin Plaza	3:37

=== Charts ===
Chart (1988)	Peak position
Australian (Kent Music Report)	5
