= Trombone Dixie =

1990 song composed by Brian Wilson performed by the Beach Boys

Instrumental by the Beach Boys

from the album Pet Sounds (1990 reissue)
- Released: 1990
- Recorded: November 1, 1965
- Studio: Western, Hollywood
- Length: 2:50
- Label: Capitol
- Composer: Brian Wilson
- Producer: Brian Wilson

"Trombone Dixie" is an instrumental composed by American musician Brian Wilson of the Beach Boys and performed by a 15-piece orchestra that included members of the Wrecking Crew. Recorded immediately before principal sessions for the band's 1966 album Pet Sounds, the track was withheld from release due to his creative dissatisfaction.

== Background ==
Wilson produced "Trombone Dixie" early in the sessions for the band's album Pet Sounds (1966). It was recorded on November 1, 1965 at Western Studio, in between sessions for "Sloop John B" (July) and the album's title track (November 17). The recording lasted from 7:00 pm to 11:30 pm. According to Brian, "I was just foolin' around one day, fuckin' around with the musicians, and I took that arrangement out of my briefcase and we did it in 20 minutes. [sic] It was nothing, there was really nothing in it."

The track contains a variation on a riff that Wilson had employed on the band's then-latest single "The Little Girl I Once Knew" (1965). He later reused elements of the intro on his song "Had to Phone Ya" (1976).

== Release ==
In 1990, "Trombone Dixie" debuted as a bonus track on the album's compact disc reissue. Excerpts from the instrumental's recording session were subsequently included on The Pet Sounds Sessions (1997).

== Personnel ==
Per John Brode, Will Crerar, Joshilyn Hoisington, and Craig Slowinski.

- Hal Blaine – drums
- Roy Caton – trumpet
- Jerry Cole – electric guitar, finger cymbals
- Steve Douglas – tenor saxophone
- James Henderson – trombone
- Carol Kaye – Fender electric bass guitar
- Barney Kessel – Danelectro 12-string electric guitar
- Jay Migliori – tenor saxophone
- Lew McCreary – trombone
- Don Randi – grand piano
- Lyle Ritz – upright bass
- Billy Strange – Mosrite 12-string electric guitar
- Ron Swallow – sleigh bells
- Julius Wechter – castanets, vibraphone
- Jerry Williams – timpani

Technical staff

- Chuck Britz – engineer

== Cover versions ==
- 2012 – Superimposers, MOJO Presents Pet Sounds Revisited
