= Devoted to You (song) =

1958 song written by Boudleaux Bryant

Single by The Everly Brothers

from the album The Best of The Everly Brothers
- B-side: "Bird Dog"
- Released: July 28, 1958
- Recorded: July 10, 1958, Nashville
- Genre: Rock and roll
- Length: 2:25
- Label: Cadence 1350
- Songwriter: Boudleaux Bryant

The Everly Brothers singles chronology
"All I Have to Do Is Dream" / "Claudette" (1958)	"Bird Dog" / "Devoted to You" (1958)	"Problems" / "Love of My Life" (1958)

"Devoted to You" is a song written by Boudleaux Bryant.

The best-known recording was by The Everly Brothers, released by Cadence Records as catalog number 1350. This version was issued as the flip side of "Bird Dog," but reached the charts on its own, at No. 10 on the United States pop charts, No. 25 in Australia, and No. 1 in Canada. In addition, the song reached No. 7 on the United States country music chart and No. 2 on the rhythm and blues chart.

== Charts ==
Chart (1958)	Peak position
US Billboard Hot 100	10
US Hot Country Songs (Billboard)	7
US Rhythm & Blues Records (Billboard)	2

== Carly Simon and James Taylor version ==
"Devoted to You"

Single by Carly Simon and James Taylor

from the album Boys in the Trees
- B-side: "Boys in the Trees"
- Released: August 1978
- Recorded: 1978
- Genre: Soft rock
- Length: 2:29
- Label: Elektra
- Songwriter: Boudleaux Bryant
- Producer: Arif Mardin

Carly Simon singles chronology
"You Belong to Me" (1978)	"Devoted to You'" (1978)	"Vengeance" (1979)

James Taylor singles chronology
"Honey Don't Leave L.A." (1978)	"Devoted to You'" (1978)	"Up on the Roof" (1979)

The song was also recorded by American singer-songwriters and then-married couple Carly Simon and James Taylor, appearing on Simon's 1978 album, Boys in the Trees. Following the smash success of the album's first single "You Belong to Me", Devoted to You was released as the second single, and it also became a Top 40 hit. Charting on both the Billboard Pop singles chart and Billboard Adult Contemporary chart, as well as the Hot Country Songs chart. The song also charted in Canada, peaking at No. 50.

Record World said that "The vocal harmonies blend perfectly and [Arif] Mardin's sparse production is, once again, flawless."

=== Personnel ===
- Carly Simon – lead vocals
- James Taylor – lead vocals, acoustic guitar
- Richard Tee – Fender Rhodes electric piano
- Hugh McCracken – electric guitar solo
- Will Lee – bass
- Steve Gadd – drums

=== Track listing ===
7" single

- "Devoted to You" – 2:29
- "Boys in the Trees" – 3:13

=== Charts ===
Chart (1978)	Peak position
Canada (RPM Charts)	9
US Billboard Pop Singles (Hot 100)	36
US Billboard Adult Contemporary	2
US Billboard Country Songs	33

== Cover versions ==
"Devoted to You"

Single by Brian Wilson and Mike Love

from the album Beach Boys' Party!
- A-side: "Gettin' Hungry"
- Released: November 8, 1965 (album); August 28, 1967 (single)
- Recorded: September 16, 1965
- Genre: Acoustic
- Length: 2:13
- Label: Capitol
- Songwriters: Felice Bryant; Boudleaux Bryant
- Producer: The Beach Boys

Brian Wilson singles chronology
"Caroline, No" (1966)	"Devoted to You" (1965)	"Let's Go to Heaven in My Car" (1988)

Mike Love singles chronology
"Gettin' Hungry" (1967)	"Lookin' Back with Love" (1981)

The Beach Boys' rendition was a part of their 1965 album Beach Boys' Party!, sung by Mike Love and Brian Wilson. This version was later included as the B-side to the Mike Love and Brian Wilson single, "Gettin' Hungry". A recording without the Party! sound effects can be found on their Hawthorne, CA compilation.

Brian Hyland covered the song for his 1964 album Here's to Our Love. Sandy Posey recorded a compelling cover on her Sweet Dreams album, in which she emulated the Everly Brothers' harmony using multi-track recording. The song was also covered by The Seekers on their 1993 live album 25 Year Reunion Celebration, and by Linda Ronstadt and Valerie Carter on Ronstadt's 1996 album Dedicated to the One I Love.
