= Kim Roberts Hedgpeth =

American labor leader

Kim Roberts Hedgpeth has held a number of executive roles within the entertainment industry. She became the Administrator of the Film Musicians Secondary Markets Fund in May 2014, where she succeeded Dennis Dreith. She also has served as the National Executive Director of the American Youth Soccer Organization since March 2013.

In 2005, she became National Executive Director of American Federation of Television and Radio Artists where she was the first woman and the first African-American to be named chief executive of a major US media industry labor organization. At the time of her departure following the merger with SAG, she'd spent more than 30 years with the union.

She received her B.A. from Harvard University and her J.D. from the Georgetown University Law Center, and is admitted to the California and New York state bars. She has served as Director of Labor and Employee Relations for Harvard University and Vice President of Human Resources of Safe Horizon. Organizations in which Hedgpeth has held membership include the New England Human Resources Association, the Massachusetts Governor's African-American Advisory Commission and the San Francisco Mayor's Film Advisory Council. She has also served as Executive Secretary of the Associated Actors and Artistes of America.
