= Hedgepeth =

Hedgepeth is a last name shared by the following people:

- Faith Hedgepeth (1992–2012), American college student killed in her apartment
- Marion Hedgepeth (1856–1909), American Wild West outlaw
- Whitney Hedgepeth (born 1971), American Olympic swimmer

== See also ==
- Hedgepeth and Williams v. Board of Education
- Hedgpeth
