= Almost Summer =

1978 film by Martin Davidson

- Theatrical release poster
- Directed by: Martin Davidson
- Written by: Judith Berg; Sandra Berg; Martin Davidson; Marc Reid Rubel
- Produced by: Rob Cohen
- Starring: Bruno Kirby; Lee Purcell; Didi Conn; John Friedrich; Thomas Carter; Tim Matheson
- Cinematography: Stevan Larner
- Edited by: Lynzee Klingman
- Music by: Ron Altbach; Charles Lloyd
- Distributed by: Universal Pictures
- Release date: April 21, 1978
- Running time: 88 min
- Country: United States
- Language: English
- Budget: $1.9 million

Almost Summer is a 1978 American comedy film directed by Martin Davidson, and produced by Motown Productions for Universal Pictures. It is the only Motown theatrical feature not to center on African-American characters. Set in a generic Southern California high school, the plot revolves around a student council election that stirs up assorted petty jealousies among various characters.

Though not successful at the box office, the film has since acquired a certain degree of historical importance because many observers consider it to be the first of a series of distinctive "youth genre" films of which more prominent examples include Fast Times at Ridgemont High and The Breakfast Club.

== Plot ==
During a California beach gathering, high school students express their backing for two juniors vying for student body president. Bobby DeVito, managing the campaign for Grant Michelson, takes bets while observing Grant's opponent, his ex-girlfriend Christine Alexander, affectionately cuddling with her new boyfriend, senior class president Kevin Hawkins.

Donna, Bobby's sister, admires a lesser-known junior named Darryl Fitzgerald, who has a crush on Christine. The next day, Bobby and his friend Dean Hampton discover that Christine had Grant suspended and is running uncontested. With only two weeks until the vote, Bobby and Dean desperately seek a replacement candidate due to their substantial bets against Christine.

While working in the attendance office, Bobby encounters Darryl, who comes in late and needs a note. Bobby sees Darryl's anonymity as an opportunity to challenge Christine. Despite initial resistance, Darryl is convinced when Bobby highlights that running for office is a way to gain attention from popular girls like Christine.

Minutes later, at the school assembly introducing the candidates, Darryl delivers a speech, making a positive impression on his classmates. Later that day, Christine and Kevin argue about their future plans after Kevin fails to secure a college football scholarship. Donna, meanwhile, excitedly plans for the senior prom, anticipating Darryl's victory.

Bobby guides Darryl through campaign preparations, making him a skilled candidate. During a hangout, Bobby informs Darryl about Donna's feelings, but Darryl is hesitant due to her involvement in his campaign, confessing he likes Christine. Dean faces relationship issues with his aspiring singer girlfriend, Nicole, who goes on a date with a record producer.

Christine challenges Darryl to a debate, accusing him of being Bobby's puppet. Donna overhears and confronts Bobby, who admits revealing her feelings to Darryl. Enraged, Donna throws food at Bobby, sparking a cafeteria food fight. Despite disagreements, Darryl accepts Christine's debate challenge.

Bobby insists Darryl can't beat Christine, but Darryl asserts his independence. At the debate, Dean interrupts, reporting police on campus arresting Duane Jackson. Darryl intervenes, quoting California law and exposing the illegal search. On election day, Donna questions Darryl's motives. Bobby and Christine call a truce, reminiscing about their past.

Darryl wins the election, but Donna declines his prom invitation, sensing a change in him. Darryl later apologizes to Bobby, who reveals the staged police bust. Darryl admits the truth to his classmates, declines the presidency, and leaves, unaware they support him. Donna visits Darryl, dressed for prom, and insists they go, as the students appreciate his honesty.

At the prom, Darryl is touched by classmates' support, Dean reunites with Nicole, and Bobby and Christine share a kiss.

== Cast ==
- Bruno Kirby as Bobby DeVito
- Lee Purcell as Christine Alexander
- John Friedrich as Darryl Fitzgerald
- Didi Conn as Donna DeVito
- Thomas Carter as Dean Hampton
- Tim Matheson as Kevin Hawkins
- Michael Stearns as Vice Cop
- Sherry Hursey as Lori Ottinger
- Gene LeBell as Rose Bowl Coach
- Harvey Lewis as Stanley Lustgarten
- Allen G. Norman as "Scratch"
- Petronia Paley as Nicole Henderson
- Donna Wilkes as Meredith
- David Wilson as Duane Jackson
- Byron Stewart as Scottie
- Robert Resnick as Grant

== Production ==
The best-known actors to star in the film were Bruno Kirby as Bobby DeVito and Tim Matheson in the role of Kevin Hawkins. The film features three professional skateboarders: Bryan Beardsley, Ty Page, and Mark Bowden. Also of note is the scene between two future stars of the TV series The White Shadow, Byron Stewart and Thomas Carter, when Dean Hampton (Carter) tries to convince basketball star Scottie (Stewart) to run for president.

Outdoor scenes were filmed at Verdugo Hills High School in Tujunga, California.

The production filming date was January 1977.

== Release ==
The film was released regionally in the United States in Dallas and Oklahoma City on April 21, 1978. The film's nationwide release was delayed until September 22, 1978.

== Reception ==
The film was rated PG by the Motion Picture Association of America, but earned a B — "objectionable in part" — rating from the United States Conference of Catholic Bishops' Office for Film and Broadcasting; the latter body observed that "the film presents in uncritical fashion a suffocatingly materialistic and amoral environment, has offensive jokes at the expense of people with physical disabilities, and flaunts a gratuitous bit of nudity."

== Soundtrack ==
Most of the soundtrack was written by Mike Love of the Beach Boys and performed by a studio band assembled by Love known as Celebration.

The title song, which became a mid-level hit single (U.S. Billboard Hot 100 #28, Canada #30), opens with the lyrics "Susie wants to be a lady director, and Eddie wants to drive a hearse; Johnny wants to be a doctor or lawyer, and Linda wants to be a nurse" — reflecting a total lack of world-changing idealism on the part of the teenage characters.

The versions of the title song and "Sad, Sad Summer" in the film are significantly different to the soundtrack album versions.

== See also ==
- List of American films of 1978
