= Susie Cincinnati =

Single by the Beach Boys

from the album 15 Big Ones
- A-side: "Add Some Music to Your Day"
- Released: February 23, 1970
- Recorded: December 24, 1969 – February 2, 1970
- Studio: Beach Boys (Bel Air)
- Label: Brother/Reprise
- Songwriter(s): Al Jardine
- Producer(s): The Beach Boys

The Beach Boys singles chronology
"Break Away" (1969)	"Susie Cincinnati" (1970)	"Cottonfields" (1970)

"Susie Cincinnati" is a song by the American rock band the Beach Boys that was recorded during the sessions for their 1970 album Sunflower. It was written by Al Jardine about a female cab driver from Ohio.

== Background ==
Al Jardine stated in a 2022 interview, "'Susie Cincinnati' is kind of a jab at The Beatles, a 'Drive My Car' kind of thing, I enjoyed that. There wasn't so much a rivalry with The Beatles, more of an appreciation. With Brian it might have been competition but myself, I enjoyed their work a lot."

== Recording ==
"Susie Cincinnati" was recorded at the Beach Boys' Bel Air studio on December 24, 1969 and January 7, 1970. The automobile sound effects were recorded on February 2, 1970.

== Release ==
The song was first issued in February 1970 as the B-side of the "Add Some Music to Your Day" single, and then again in December 1974 as the B-side of the "Child of Winter (Christmas Song)" single. In 1976, it was included as a track on the album 15 Big Ones. Brian Wilson included it on the LP "because it's a good song", although Dennis Wilson felt that it was a "silly piece of shit".

== Personnel ==
Per liner notes.

The Beach Boys

- Al Jardine – lead and backing vocals, guitar
- Bruce Johnston – backing vocals
- Mike Love – backing vocals
- Brian Wilson – backing vocals, harmonica, bass
- Carl Wilson – backing vocals, guitar
- Dennis Wilson – backing vocals

Session musicians

- Daryl Dragon – clavinet
- Dennis Dragon – drums
