= The Six Teens =

Pop group from USA

The Six Teens were an American pop group from Los Angeles, California, United States.

All of the group's members were teenagers, or younger, at the time of their first recordings: the oldest was 17-year-old Ed Wells and the youngest, 12-year-old Trudy Williams. Their first release was the song "Don't Worry About a Thing", released by Flip Records under the name The Sweet Teens in 1956. Following this was the single "Teen Age Promise" b/w "A Casual Look", released on Flip later that year under their new name. "A Casual Look" became a hit at radio and hit the national charts, peaking at No. 7 on the U.S. Black Singles chart and No. 25 on the Billboard Hot 100.

Following the success of "A Casual Look", the group moved to Hawaii and performed there in the summer of 1957. Their next release, "Send Me Flowers", was a hit there. "Only Jim" and "Arrow of Love" followed, with the former failing to chart and the latter hitting No. 80 Pop. The group underwent a lineup change and began recording singles for younger audiences, but they saw no further success. Under varying lineups, they continued to perform into the late 1960s. In later decades they regrouped to play doo-wop revival shows.

== Members ==
- Louise Williams
- Darryl Lewis
- Beverly Pecot
- Trudy Williams
- Kenneth Sinclair
- Ed Wells
