= Celebration (1970s band) =

American rock band

- Genres: Rock; pop rock
- Years active: 1977–1979
- Labels: MCA; Pacific Arts; ADC
- Past members: Mike Love; Dave "Doc" Robinson; Ron Altbach; Charles Lloyd; Paul Fauerso

Celebration was a 1970s American rock band, fronted by Beach Boys lead singer Mike Love as well as members of the band King Harvest. Celebration released three albums before they broke up in 1979.

== Background ==
During the late 1970s, Beach Boys singer Mike Love began to work on outside projects. His first major work was with a new band, Celebration. The band featured members of the short lived band King Harvest as well as future and current Beach Boys live backing members. Love met Charles Lloyd and Ron Altbach in the 1960s while studying Transcendental Meditation. Love attributed the formation of the band to their shared interest in meditating.

The band's first project was a soundtrack for the film Almost Summer. The lead single of the name was written by Love and his Beach Boys bandmates Al Jardine and Brian Wilson and also featured backing vocals from Brian Wilson. The song reached No. 28 on the Billboard Hot 100 in 1978. The band followed up the album with two more albums, one of original material and another of disco numbers. Despite several live appearances and some success, the band disbanded in 1979; however, some members of the group continued to perform with Mike Love in the Beach Boys backing band.

== Members ==
Almost Summer album:

- Mike Love - lead vocals
- Charles Lloyd - saxophone, flute
- Ron Altbach - keyboards
- Dave "Doc" Robinson - lead and backing vocals, bass
- Paul Fauerso - Lead and backing vocals, keyboards
- Ed Carter - guitar
- Wells Kelly - bass
- Gary Griffin - keyboards

Additional musicians:

- Steve Douglas - saxophone
- Rusty Ford - bass
- Tom Smith - drums
- Sterling Smith - synthesizers
- Ed Tuleja - guitars
- Dave Bunch - guitars
- Maureen Love - harp

Celebration album:

- Mike Love - lead vocals
- Dave "Doc" Robinson - backing vocals
- Ron Altbach - keyboards
- Charles Lloyd - saxophone
- Paul Fauerso - keyboards, backing vocals
- Tim Weston - guitar
- Kevin Brandon - bass
- Kim Calkins - drums

== Discography ==
=== Albums ===
- 1978: Almost Summer: Music from the Original Motion Picture Score (MCA Records)
- 1979: Celebration (Pacific Arts Records)
- 1979: Disco Celebration (ADC Records)

=== Singles ===
- 1978: "Almost Summer" - # 28 on Billboard Hot 100; # 30 on RPM Top 100
- 1978: "It’s O.K."
- 1978: "Summer in the City"/"Island Girl"
- 1979: "Country Pie"/"Gettin’ Hungry"
- 1979: "Starbaby"/"Gettin’ Hungry"
