= Flip Records (1950s) =

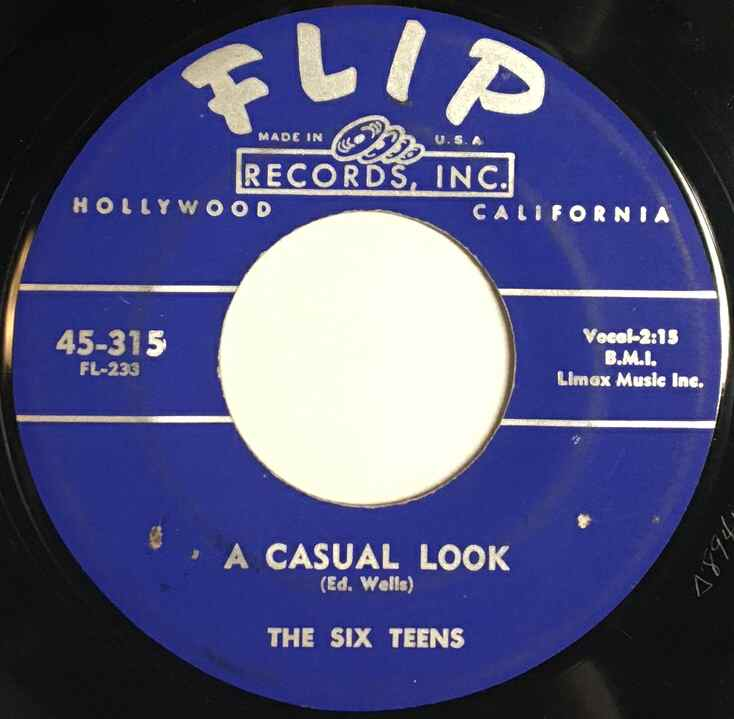
- Flip 45 rpm label, by The Six Teens singing "A Casual Look"
- Founded: 1950
- Country of origin: United States

Flip Records was an American record label that flourished in the 1950s, releasing rhythm and blues and doo-wop music by such artists as Richard Berry, The Six Teens, Donald Wood, the Elgins, and many others. Max and Lilian Feirtag operated the label in Los Angeles, California, and published music under the Limax Music trademark.

The biggest, most lasting success was Richard Berry's original recording of his song "Louie, Louie," which came out in 1957 (although it was only a regional hit and The Six Teens' "A Casual Look" was a much bigger national hit).

In 2000, Ace Records of England purchased the assets of the original Flip Records catalog, and has been releasing this vintage music for the CD market.

== See also ==
- List of record labels
- Flip Records
