= Film Musicians Secondary Markets Fund =

American music organization

The Film Musicians Secondary Markets Fund is a not-for-profit organization that collects and processes residual payments from producers and distributes them to film and television musicians. The Fund was established in 1972 as part of a collective bargaining agreement negotiated between the American Federation of Musicians (AFM) and the Alliance of Motion Picture and Television Producers.

Each July, the Fund makes an annual distribution of residuals received throughout its fiscal year to participating musicians. Musicians must have worked on film and television projects scored under the AFM agreements to qualify as participating musicians. There are approximately 45,000 participating musicians entitled to receive residuals.

Producers and/or other rights holders make payments to the Fund equal to one percent of their gross receipts from the release of covered films (post 1960) into the ancillary or supplemental markets. These obligations last for the life of the motion picture and remain with the production regardless of how many times the ownership and/or distribution rights are transferred.

The Fund's offices are located in Encino, California.

== Administrators ==
- 2024 - Present - Brian Sickles
- 2014–2024 - Kim Roberts Hedgpeth
- 1999–2014 - Dennis Dreith
- 1972–1999 - Ed Peters
