= Dennis Dreith =

Dennis Dreith (born June 15, 1948 in Glendale, California) is a musician, record producer and a television & motion picture composer, arranger, and conductor. He is also known as an influential advocate for performers’ rights.

== Life ==
Dreith showed a talent for music at an early age and learned to play a variety of keyboard and reed instruments while still in his teens. While in college, Dreith played woodwinds and toured with Paul Revere & the Raiders and The Beach Boys. He later toured with the Osmond Brothers and recorded with many artists including Leon Russell, Giorgio Moroder, Mama's Pride and Firefall, often as a musician as well as an arranger and conductor. He recorded on The Beach Boys “15 Big Ones” for which he was awarded an RIAA Gold Record.

== Career ==
Dreith has been the composer for such films as Purple People Eater (1988) and The Punisher (1989), and is also known in the industry as an orchestrator and conductor of film music scores. His work can be heard in the soundtracks of Jurassic Park, Misery, Braveheart, Addams Family Values, Sleepless in Seattle, Heart and Souls, A League of Their Own and others. He has orchestrated and conducted for several well-known composers including John Williams, Lalo Schifrin, Dominic Frontiere, Marc Shaiman, Hans Zimmer, Elliot Goldenthal, Mark Isham and Cliff Eidelman.

Dreith has also produced numerous jazz and R & B records working with such notables as The Tokens and The O'Jays (arranging and producing several cuts on their acclaimed “Home for Christmas” album (The O'Jays discography).

Dreith eventually became president of the Recording Musicians Association (RMA), a player conference of the American Federation of Musicians (AFM) devoted to improving the lives and livelihoods of working musicians. He held that post for over 15 years.

== National and International negotiations ==
Dreith was also a member and consultant for the American Federation of Musicians Negotiating Sub-committee for every major electronic media agreement negotiated by them. During that time, he was also AFM liaison to both the Film Musicians Secondary Markets Fund (FMSMF), and the Sound Recording Special Payments Fund ("SRSPF"), where he addressed the House Sub-committee on Intellectual Properties in support of Digital Performers Rights legislation in Washington, D.C. that was signed into law by President Bill Clinton in November 1995.

In 1996, he traveled to Japan where he negotiated and executed a "Friendship Agreement" between the Musicians Rights Commission of Japan and the RMA, which in turn has resulted in the substantial distribution of Japanese royalties to U.S. recording musicians.

== Other work ==
Dreith served as the Administrator of the Film Musicians Secondary Markets Fund since 1998 and simultaneously as the Executive Director of the AFM & SAG-AFTRA Intellectual Property Rights Distribution Fund until 2017, overseeing the Japanese Record Rental Royalty Fund, the Audio Home Recording Act Fund, and Digital Performance Royalties under the Digital Performance Right in Sound Recordings Act on behalf of non-featured performers. In 2017, Dreith co-founded Transparence Entertainment Group with industry veteran Shari Hoffman . Dreith serves as the company's Chairman.

Dreith continues to own and operate his own publishing and production company Magic Closet Music , performs regularly with his 17-piece jazz ensemble , and is the Managing Partner of Graef Wine .

He is a speaker at a variety of music education and related conferences in the United States and worldwide including the Cannes film festival, SXSW, and the ASCAP I Create Music Expo. He is a former member of the faculty at UCLA Extension as well as a past member of the UCLA Advisory Board to the Department of Entertainment Studies and Performing Arts.

Dreith is on the board of directors for the charity "Environment of People Foundation, Inc." which strives to ensure that music and the arts remain a central part of our children's lives and growth.
