= Mike Love =

American singer and lyricist (born 1941)

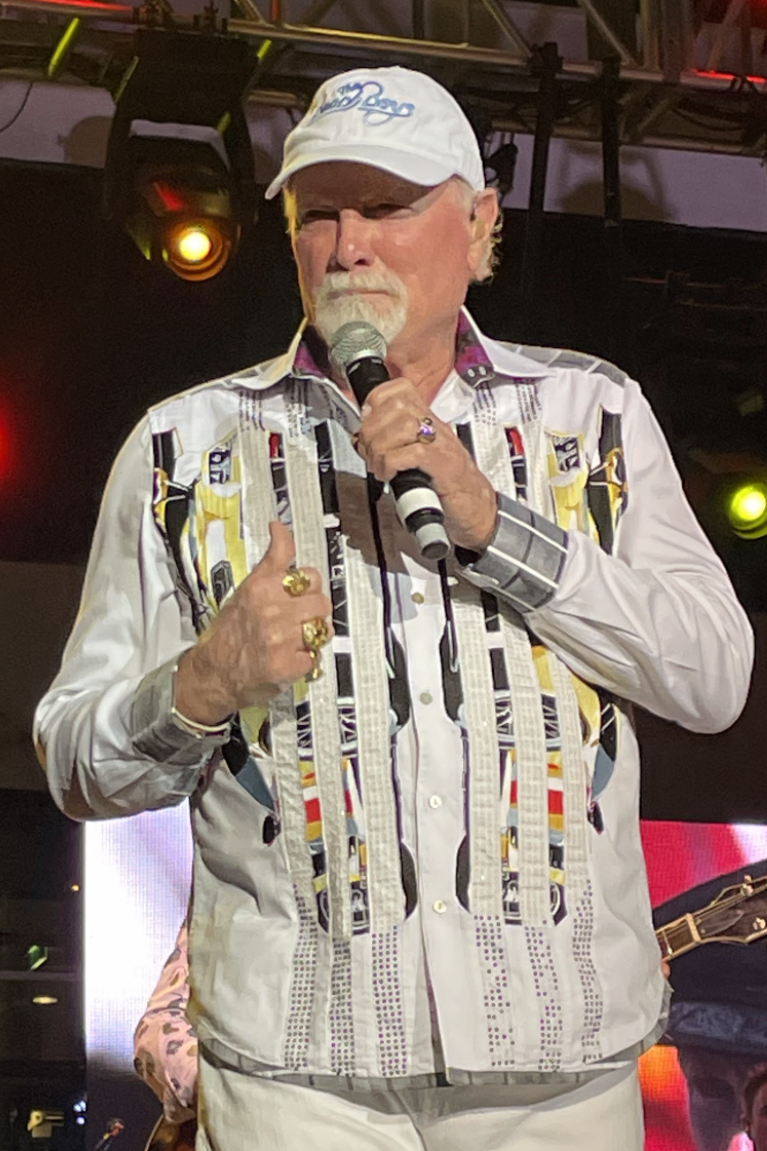
- Love performing in 2022

Background information
- Born: Michael Edward Love; March 15, 1941 (age 85); Los Angeles, California, U.S.
- Origin: Hawthorne, California, U.S.
- Genres: Rock; pop
- Occupations: Singer; lyricist
- Instruments: Vocals; tambourine; saxophone; electro-theremin
- Years active: 1961–present
- Labels: Capitol; Brother; EMI; Boardwalk; Creole; Epic
- Member of: The Beach Boys
- Formerly of: Celebration
- Spouses: Francis Emily St. Martin (m. 1961; div. 1964) Suzanne Belcher (m. 1965; div. 1970) Tamara Fitch (m. 1971; div. 1977) Sue Oliver (m. 1977; ann. 1977) Catherine Linda Martinez (m. 1981; div. 1984) Jacquelyne Piesen (m. 1994)
- Website: mikelove.com

Michael Edward Love (born March 15, 1941) is an American singer and lyricist who co-founded the Beach Boys alongside his cousins Brian, Dennis, and Carl Wilson and their friend Al Jardine. Characterized by his nasally baritone singing voice, he consistently sang on their recordings and usually served as their frontman on stage. Drawing inspiration from doo wop, Chuck Berry and Felice and Boudleaux Bryant, Love's lyrics primarily reflected the youth culture of surfing, cars, and romance, which helped fashion pop culture's perception of the "California Dream". He is credited with co-writing 15 songs with Brian that reached the U.S. Top 40, including "Fun, Fun, Fun", "I Get Around", "Help Me, Rhonda", "California Girls", "Good Vibrations", and "Do It Again".

Starting in 1968, Love was a student of Transcendental Meditation (TM) under Maharishi Mahesh Yogi, and he became a TM teacher in 1971. The experience influenced his lyrics to take on themes of astrology, meditation, politics and ecology. In the late 1970s, he fronted Celebration, a short-lived band that consisted of Beach Boys touring musicians, and began working on solo albums, releasing his first, Looking Back with Love, in 1981. His U.S. top 40 hits co-authored without Brian were the Beach Boys' "Getcha Back" and "Kokomo". Often vilified by fans and critics for conflicts with his bandmates, many of his lyrical contributions to the group's hits were not officially recognized until the 1990s, when he sued Brian for writing credits on 35 songs. Love remains uncredited for another 44 Beach Boys songs he claimed to have co-written.

Following Carl's death in 1998, the band members and their corporation, Brother Records, Inc., granted Love an exclusive license to tour under the Beach Boys' name. Since then, Love has maintained a near-constant touring regimen with his edition of the group and has released three more solo albums. He was inducted into the Rock and Roll Hall of Fame as a member of the Beach Boys in 1988. Beyond music, he has taken part in projects to promote international charities related to such subjects as environmentalism, juvenile diabetes, and music education.

== Background ==
Michael Edward Love, the first of six children, was born in the Baldwin Hills neighborhood of Los Angeles on March 15, 1941. Love's mother, Emily "Glee" Wilson (1919–1979), was the sister of Murry Wilson, a resident of Los Angeles since the early 1920s, and part-time songwriter. Glee married Edward Milton Love (1918–2013), the son of the founder of the Love Sheet Metal Company, in 1938. After Love's birth, the family moved to the View Park-Windsor Hills neighborhood. As a child, Love wrote his first song, "The Old Soldier", which Murry Wilson described as a "song in hymn form" in a 1971 interview. Murry reworked the song as "By His Side (When Jesus Calls His Soldiers)" with new lyrics, and Love's cousin Brian Wilson performed both songs at a concert held in Love's house. "By His Side" was copyrighted in September 1951.

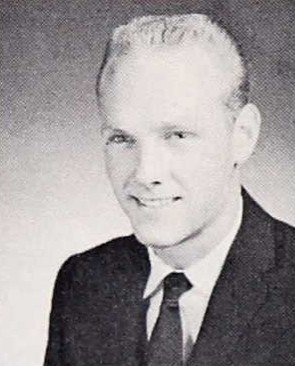
Love's Dorsey High School portrait, 1959

Love attended Dorsey High School and graduated in 1959. He attended two semesters at Los Angeles City College, where he ran track and played basketball. Unsure of a career direction, Love joined his father's company, Love Sheet Metal, whose fortunes had begun to dramatically decline in the late 1950s. Later, Love also worked as a gas station attendant to help support himself and his first wife. Both Milt and Glee Love were active in sports, and Love's younger brother Stan Love later played in the National Basketball Association. Glee had a distinct interest in painting and the arts. Like her brother, Murry, however, she was also strong-willed and, according to her husband, a dominant personality. The family was close-knit and regularly socialized with Murry and his family.

Love often sang at family get-togethers at his cousins, the Wilsons' home in nearby Hawthorne, especially at Christmas. During this time, the Beach Boys sound was established, predominantly influenced by Brian's devotion to the Four Freshmen's arrangements. Musical accompaniment during this formative phase was solely Brian's self-taught piano, but this was quickly expanded by the guitar contributions of Brian's college friend Al Jardine (whose fundamental interest was folk music) and Carl Wilson (whose idol was Chuck Berry). With the failure of Love Sheet Metal, the family was forced to move to a modest two-bedroom house in Inglewood, closer to the Wilsons.

== Early career ==
=== Songwriting and reported artistic conflicts ===
Love played rudimentary saxophone in the first years of the fledgling garage band that evolved from the Pendletones to the Beach Boys. He also established himself, along with neighbor Gary Usher, local DJ Roger Christian, and others, as a collaborator with Brian Wilson in the band's original compositions. To help write many of the Beach Boys songs, Love drew inspiration from the lyrics of Chuck Berry along with Felice and Boudleaux Bryant, who wrote many of the Everly Brothers' songs including "Devoted to You" and "All I Have to Do is Dream". He explained, "They were both the fun, descriptive pictorial vignettes as well as the more sweet, romantic and devotional lyrics. ... Even before that and more fundamental than that, I was always into poetry." Carl credited Love, an avid fan of doo-wop combos, with majorly contributing to the band's "funkier" vocal approaches and influencing Brian to listen to black R&B records; journalist Geoffrey Himes argued that without "Mike's R&B influence ... Brian couldn't have possibly become 'Brian Wilson.'"

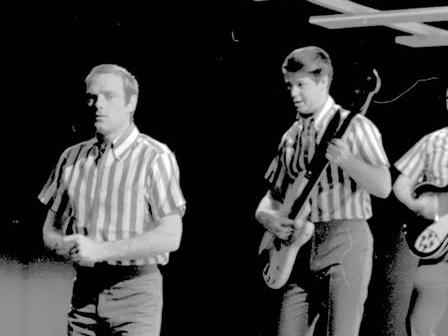
Love (left) and Brian Wilson performing with the Beach Boys, 1964

In early 1964, Brian shifted the Beach Boys away from beach-themed music. That November, Love told a Melody Maker reporter that he and his bandmates wanted to look beyond surf music and avoid living in the past or resting on the band's laurels. Love is credited with naming their 1966 album Pet Sounds. Love stated in the 1970 series Pop Chronicles that the planned follow-up, Smile, was "good stuff" and "a fantastically-produced album", adding that "it'll come out, eventually." Asked for his favorite Beach Boys album in a 1994 interview, Love responded, "I guess Pet Sounds ... because of the orchestrations and arrangement. Because it's not just about cars or girls or school, but it's about feelings."

Many reports conversely suggest that Love had resisted the group's new direction. In the description of music journalist Erik Hedegaard, Love gathered a reputation as "one of the biggest assholes in the history of rock & roll" due to such characterizations. Love commented in a 2007 interview, "it's a bunch of crap to say that I didn't like the Pet Sounds album", and he rejected many of the reported claims concerning his involvement in the shelving of Smile. In a 1971 Rolling Stone article, former Brother Records head David Anderle originated "don't fuck with the formula" , a quote often attributed to Love and later repeated in myriad books, articles, websites, and blogs.

Love at a Beach Boys photoshoot, 1967

Love returned to co-writing with Brian for the Beach Boys' December 1967 album Wild Honey, the group's first foray into R&B. He later reported that the group's unhappiness with Capitol's promotional efforts had led them to change record companies in the late 1960s and that the company had "failed" to adapt following "'Good Vibrations', Pet Sounds, Smiley Smile or Vietnam and everything else". In his 2016 memoir, he wrote that, unlike Brian, he was never concerned about being taken seriously by critics, and felt that detractors of their early songs showed "elitism at its worst: because so many people loved our music, there must be something wrong with it."

=== Maharishi and TM training ===
In late 1967, Love became one of the many rock musicians who discovered the teachings of Maharishi Mahesh Yogi following the Beatles' public endorsement of his Transcendental Meditation (TM) technique in August 1967. In December, Love and his bandmates attended a lecture by the Maharishi at a UNICEF Variety Gala in Paris, and were moved by the simplicity and effectiveness of his meditation process as a means to obtaining inner peace. In January 1968, the Beach Boys attended the Maharishi's public appearances in New York and Cambridge, Massachusetts, after which he invited Love to join the Beatles at his training seminar in Rishikesh in northern India. Love stayed there from February 28 to March 15. He later claimed to help Paul McCartney with the lyrics of "Back in the U.S.S.R.", recorded for the Beatles' 1968 self-titled album (also known as "the White Album").

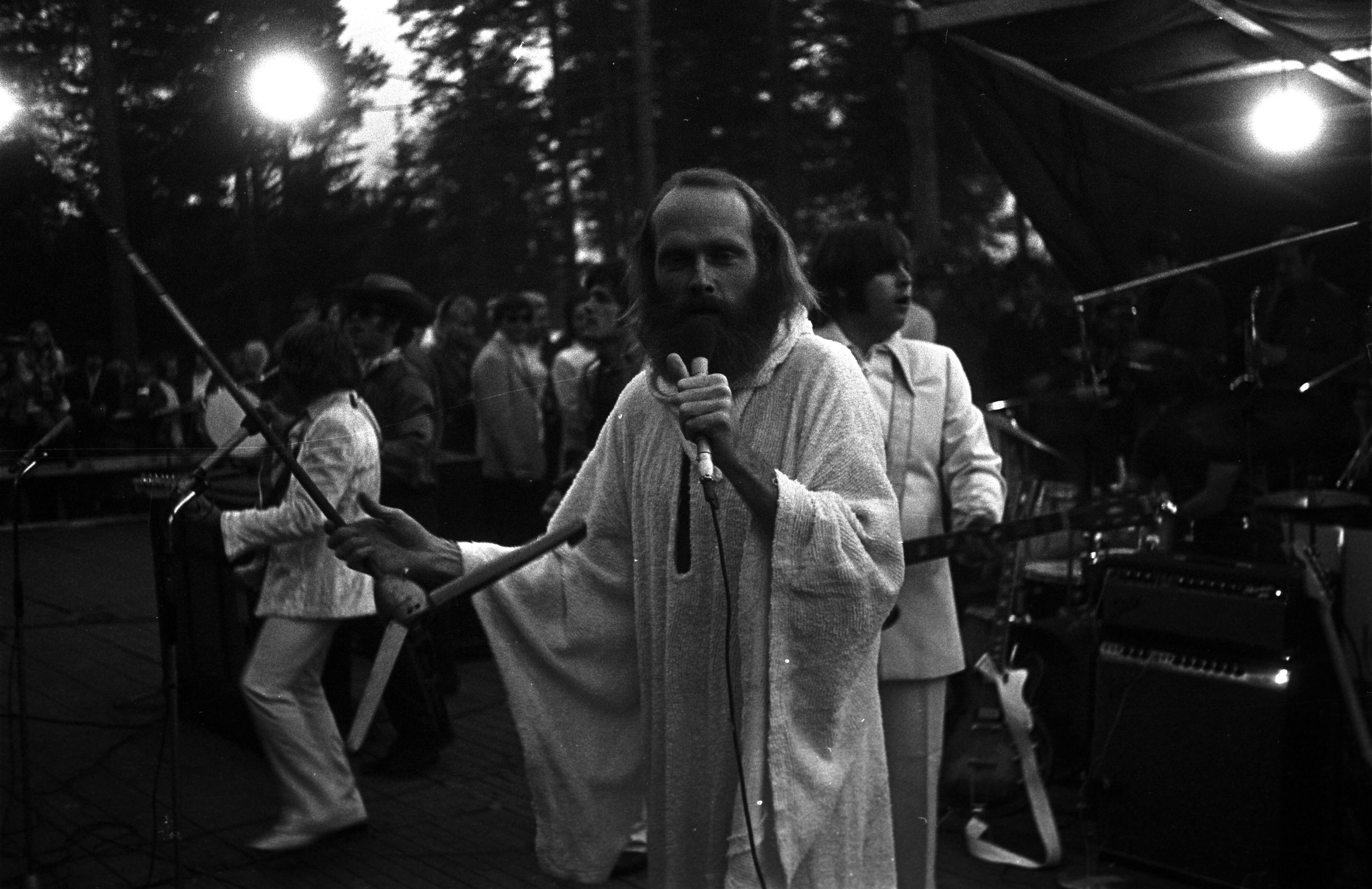
Love performing in Sweden with the Beach Boys, 1969

While in Rishikesh, Love planned a U.S. concert tour that would feature the Beach Boys and the Maharishi as co-headliners. The tour began in May 1968, and ended abruptly after five shows due to the disappointing audience numbers and the Maharishi's subsequent withdrawal to fulfill film contracts. In his 2016 autobiography, Love wrote: "I take responsibility for an idea that didn't work. But I don't regret it. I thought I could do some good for people who were lost, confused, or troubled, particularly those who were young and idealistic but also vulnerable, and I thought that was true for a whole bunch of us." Despite the ignominy of the tour, the Beach Boys remained ardent supporters of the Maharishi and TM. Love became a TM initiator in 1972 and later progressed to more advanced levels such as the TM-Sidhi Course.

== Later career ==
=== Sideprojects, first solo albums, and "Kokomo" ===
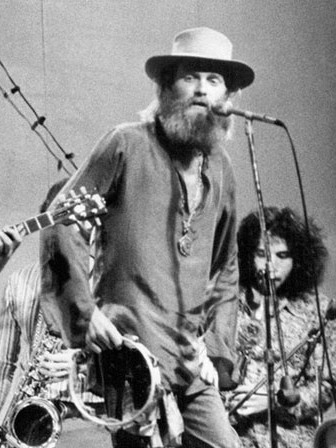
Love performing at Central Park with the Beach Boys, 1971

Throughout the 1970s and 1980s, Love wrote the words and music of several Beach Boys songs, including "Big Sur" (1973), "Everyone's in Love with You" (1976) and "Sumahama" (1978). In 1977, he co-founded the band Celebration, which achieved the U.S. Top 30 hit single "Almost Summer" in 1978. The song was written by Brian Wilson, Love, and Al Jardine as the title theme for the film of the same name.

Love also recorded two solo albums in October and November 1978. First Love was produced by Love's Celebration collaborator Paul Fauerso and featured original songs by Love and vocals from cousin and Beach Boys bandmate Carl Wilson. Country Love was a country album produced by Al Perkins (a pedal steel guitarist formerly of The Flying Burrito Brothers and Manassas) and mostly featured original songs written by Love. Both albums were not released but were later bootlegged; Love revisited and re-recorded several songs from First Love later in his solo career and with The Beach Boys. The First Love version of "Brian's Back", written about the fairly recent return of Love's cousin and Beach Boys bandmate to recording and touring with the group, was later released on the Beach Boys' 1998 compilation album Endless Harmony Soundtrack.

In 1981, Love's first solo album, Looking Back with Love, was released with production by Curt Boettcher. Love also began touring with his own group, the Endless Summer Beach Band, which included Jeffrey Foskett. Love occasionally performed with the group into the 1990s. The following year, Love began performing with Dean Torrence as Mike and Dean. Torrence wrote in his biography Surf City: The Jan and Dean Story that Love had wanted to pursue "corporate sponsored dates" and a sponsorship deal with Radio Shack, which the other Beach Boys were opposed to doing. Torrence wanted to fulfill a contract with Budweiser for a planned series of spring break concerts originally set to feature Jan and Dean. Love and Torrence also participated in the 1983 compilation album Rock 'n' Roll City, which was available exclusively at Radio Shack stores, and featuring new recordings of 1960s songs performed by Love, Torrence, the Association, Paul Revere and the Raiders, the Rip Chords, and the Beach Boys.

In 1988, the Beach Boys had a U.S. number 1 hit with "Kokomo", the only number 1 the band achieved without Brian's involvement. Love (along with "Kokomo" co-writers Scott McKenzie, Terry Melcher, and John Phillips) was nominated for a Golden Globe Award (1988) in the Original Song category, and was nominated for a Grammy Award, for "Kokomo". Also in 1988, Love was inducted into the Rock and Roll Hall of Fame along with the other founding members of the Beach Boys. At the induction ceremony Love delivered a hostile speech, criticizing McCartney, Bruce Springsteen, Billy Joel, Diana Ross, and Mick Jagger. When asked in 2016 if he regretted anything about the night, Love said, "Yeah, I regret that I didn't meditate [earlier that day]."

In 1994, Love began touring with another group, the California Beach Band. The group was active until at least 1999.

=== 1994 credits lawsuit ===
In 1992, Love, along with Jardine and several Wilson family members, sued Brian for defamation regarding claims made in his 1991 memoir Wouldn't It Be Nice: My Own Story. The case was settled out of court by publisher HarperCollins, who awarded Love $1.5 million. It was the first of numerous lawsuits that Love would file against Brian. Two years later, Love won a legal proceeding to establish what he considered to be proper authorship credit for many of the Beach Boys songs he co-wrote. Love successfully argued that Murry Wilson avoided crediting him with his early lyrical contributions to Brian's songs, denying Love accrued royalties. He later called it "almost certainly the largest case of fraud in music history". Brian agreed to pay Love $5 million and split future royalties on 35 songs.

=== Continued touring ===
After the death of Carl Wilson in 1998, Love continued to tour with the Beach Boys, along with Bruce Johnston, David Marks, who had briefly returned and a supporting band of new musicians, occasionally including actor John Stamos. He leased exclusive rights to tour under the Beach Boys name in a boardroom settlement with Brother Records, the Beach Boys' company. However, former bandmate Jardine had been touring under the banners "Beach Boys Family & Friends", "Al Jardine, Beach Boy" and "Al Jardine of the Beach Boys" during this time and Love decided to sue him in order to prevent the use of the name. In the lawsuit the courts ruled in Love's favor, denying Jardine the use of the Beach Boys name in any fashion. Jardine proceeded to appeal this decision in addition to seeking $4 million in damages. The California Court of Appeal proceeded to rule that, "Love acted wrongfully in freezing Jardine out of touring under the Beach Boys name", allowing Jardine to continue with his lawsuit. The case ended up being settled outside of court with the terms not disclosed.

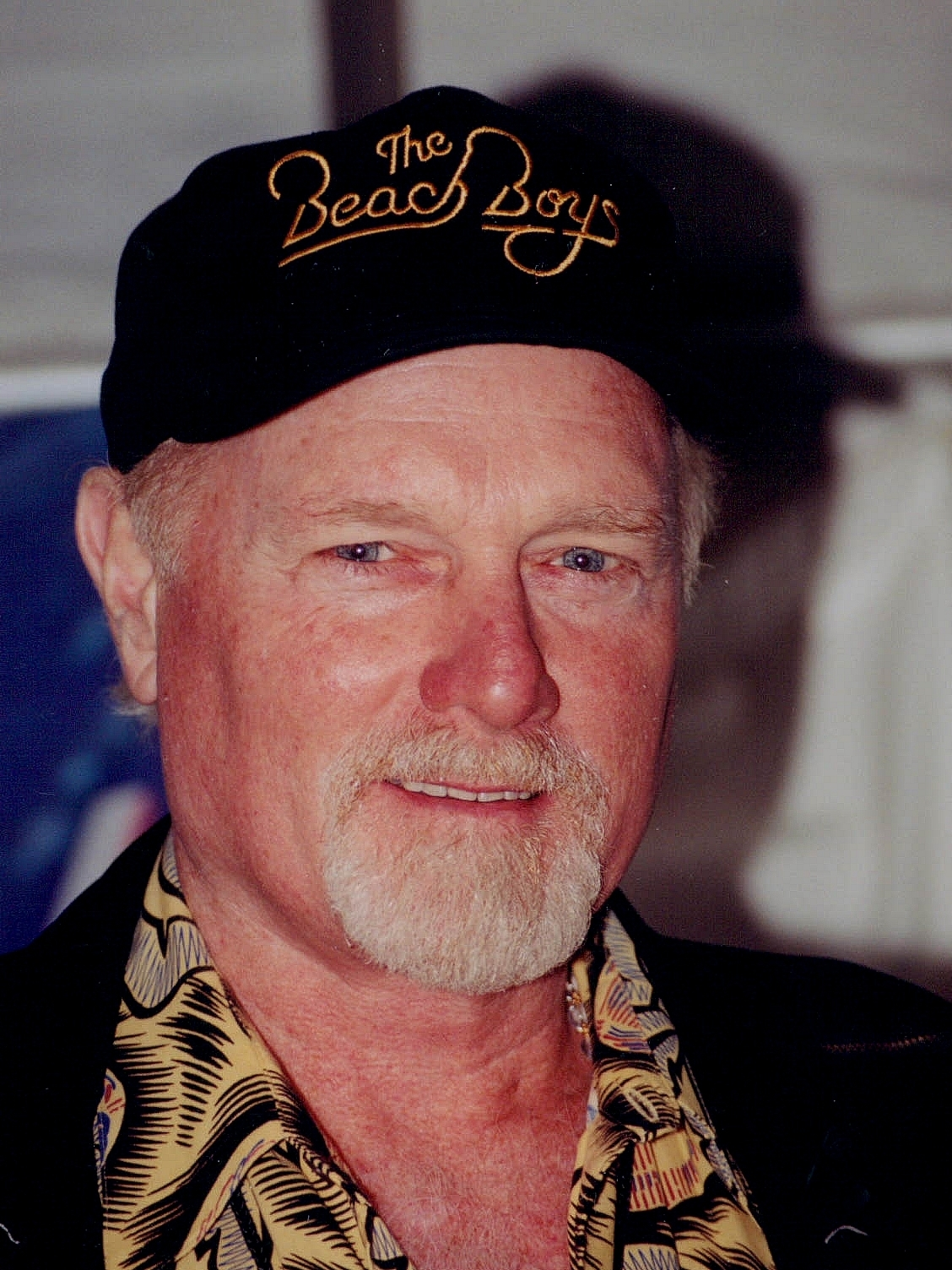
Love at an Earth Day conference in 2001

In 2000, ABC premiered a two-part television miniseries, The Beach Boys: An American Family, that dramatized the Beach Boys' story. It was produced by Stamos and was criticized for historical inaccuracies. Love was an advisor to the film. Some critics accused him of having the film overstate his role in the band and portray negative depictions of Brian and Smile collaborator Van Dyke Parks.

On November 3, 2005, Love sued Brian and the British newspaper The Mail On Sunday because the Beach Boys' name and Love's image were used in a promotional CD that was given free with the paper to promote the 2004 Brian Wilson Presents Smile release. Love argued that the unauthorized (by Brother Records Inc.) free CD resulted in loss of income for the band. Wilson's wife Melinda alleged that, during the deposition, Love turned to Wilson and remarked, "you better start writing a real big hit because you're going to have to write me a real big check." The lawsuit was dismissed on May 16, 2007, on the grounds that it was without merit.

In 2011, Love reunited with Brian, Jardine, Johnston and David Marks for a new Beach Boys album and 50th anniversary tour beginning in 2012. In September 2012, Love and Johnston announced via a press release that following the end of the reunion tour the Beach Boys would revert to the Love/Johnston lineup, without Brian, Jardine or Marks, all of whom expressed surprise. Although such dates were noted in a late June issue of Rolling Stone, it was widely reported that the three had been "fired".

==== Autobiography and later solo albums ====
In 2015, Love released the single "(You'll Never Be) Alone on Christmas Day", after the French band Phoenix recorded a cover of the song for the Netflix film A Very Murray Christmas. The track was originally recorded by the Beach Boys in the 1970s, but was left unreleased. In 2016, Love released his autobiography Good Vibrations: My Life as a Beach Boy. He wrote the book as a response to "many inaccuracies" that had he claimed were said about him over the decades. It was published one month before the release of Brian's autobiography, I Am Brian Wilson: A Memoir.

Love performing with Bruce Johnston (left) as "the Beach Boys" in 2019

On November 17, 2017, Love released his second solo album Unleash the Love, which included contributions from Dave Koz, John Stamos, Mark McGrath, AJR, and John Cowsill. Stamos played drums on two songs featured in the album. On October 26, 2018, Love released his third solo album, Reason for the Season, featuring traditional and original Christmas music. Love's fourth album 12 Sides Of Summer was released on July 19, 2019. The band Hanson appeared on the track "California Beach".

In 2020, Love released the single "This Too Shall Pass", a song about the COVID-19 pandemic. The song featured Stamos on drums. All proceeds from the single were to be donated to Feeding America. In 2022, Love and Johnston were featured artists on LoCash's single "Beach Boys". The following year, Love released his fifth album, Mike Love Not War. Digital download links were included with the purchase of Beach Boys tickets. Love had previously used the title for an unreleased album and described it in 2013 as "a brilliant title and a necessary title".

==== Illness ====
After Johnston quit the Beach Boys in March 2026, Love became the only official member to still tour with the band. Love began experiencing health issues, which led to the Beach Boys canceling or rescheduling concerts. Variety noted that Love was a "less robust presence on stage" when the band performed a series of concerts at the Hollywood Bowl in early July. On July 23, Love's Instagram account posted a message stating the Beach Boys would be taking time off from the road until September to "recharge". In a later Rolling Stone article, Dean Torrence reported that Love had been struggling with his health, but also said "he's not going to stop until it’s really over".

On September 23, Love canceled more tour dates. On October 10, at the Beach Boys' first public concert since July, Stamos introduced Love, whom he stated "would not miss tonight" and refused to "stay home" despite objections from his doctors, friends and family. Love was walked onstage, sat for the duration of the show and was described by Andy Greene of Rolling Stone as looking "alarmingly frail", his presence limited to occasional backing vocals. In a statement released through New York Times on October 22, Love confirmed that he was currently attending a rehab facility, and added that he hoped to "get back to the music and the best fans in the world."

On October 28, the Beach Boys, who were scheduled to appear at Epcot Center in November, were replaced with John Stamos and the California Sound. The Beach Boys later canceled a scheduled performance at the Hard Rock Hotel & Casino Bristol in Virginia on November 13, leaving a single planned concert date for 2027 in Alberta, Canada.

== Personal life ==
=== Marriages and family ===
Love has been married 6 times and has 8 children. Love met his first wife, Francis Emily St. Martin, in high school. They wed on January 4, 1961 and had two daughters, Melinda (born 1961) and Teresa (born 1962). Martin divorced Love in 1963, citing "extreme cruelty". She alleged Love had "struck her on the arm and ripped her clothes" and had also threatened her "on other occasions". Martin received custody of their two children. The divorce became final on May 22, 1964.

In September 1965, Love met his second wife, Suzanne Belcher, at a recording session for Beach Boys' Party!. The couple married "after dating for about two weeks" in Las Vegas on October 15, 1965. They had two children, Hayleigh (born 1966) and Christian (born 1968). The couple separated three years later. In court documents, both parties accused each other of adultery. Love alleged that Belcher had an affair with Dennis Wilson, which she denied. Belcher additionally cited "cruelty", while Love alleged Belcher was "[involved] with 'hippies' and people associated with drugs" and had religious hallucinations. The couple's divorce was granted on February 3, 1970. Love received custody of their two children.

In July 1971, Love met his third wife, Tamara Fitch, a college student. The couple married six weeks later at the home of Charles Lloyd, then a touring member of the Beach Boys. The couple had a daughter, Summer (born 1972), but separated after a year, and divorced in 1977. Later that year, Love married his fourth wife, Sue Oliver, which ended in annulment after six months.

On September 17, 1981, Mike Love married his fifth wife, Catherine Linda Martinez at his home in Santa Barbara in a ceremony officiated by Wolfman Jack. The wedding was attended by all then-current members of the Beach Boys. Love and Martinez raised a son, Mike Love Jr. (born 1982). The couple divorced in 1984. In 1993, Love discovered Mike Jr. was not his biological son. Love and Martinez went to paternity court, which resulted in Martinez being ordered to pay a fine for "fraud of paternity" and Love being forced to cease contact with Mike Jr.; Love reunited with Mike Jr. at a Beach Boys concert in 1999.

In 1987, Love met his sixth wife, Jacquelyne Piesen, while judging a bikini contest in Waikiki, Hawaii. Piesen was in a relationship with her fiancé at the time, which ended a few weeks later. Love and Piesen maintained a long-distance relationship for several months, before he asked her to live with him. The couple had two children, Brian (born 1988) and Ambha (born 1996). The couple married on April 24, 1994. Brian and Carl Wilson attended the wedding.

In the late 2000s, Love's son Christian began performing with the Beach Boys touring group as guitarist and vocalist. He was no longer a member of the group as of 2016, but he had returned by 2018. Love's daughter Ambha occasionally performs with the Beach Boys. Christian and Ambha performed with California Saga, a group formed by children of the Beach Boys in 2012. In 2018, Christian, Brian, Hayleigh, and Ambha appeared on Mike's version of "O Holy Night" on his album Reason for the Season. In 2020, Christian, Hayleigh, and Ambha appeared with Mike on the revived California Music supergroup's cover of "Add Some Music to Your Day".

As of 2015, Love resided in Incline Village, Nevada, on the northern shore of Lake Tahoe. In April 2026, he placed the house on sale for $43 million. Love is a vegetarian who practices Transcendental Meditation, wears Indian Ayurveda rings, and partakes in traditional Hindu ceremonies.

Love is the brother of former NBA basketball player Stan Love, and Pink Martini harpist Maureen Love, and the uncle of Utah Jazz basketball player Kevin Love. Shawn Marie Harris, a woman who was married to Dennis Wilson in his final months of life, alleged she was Love's daughter, an accusation Love has denied.

=== Political views ===
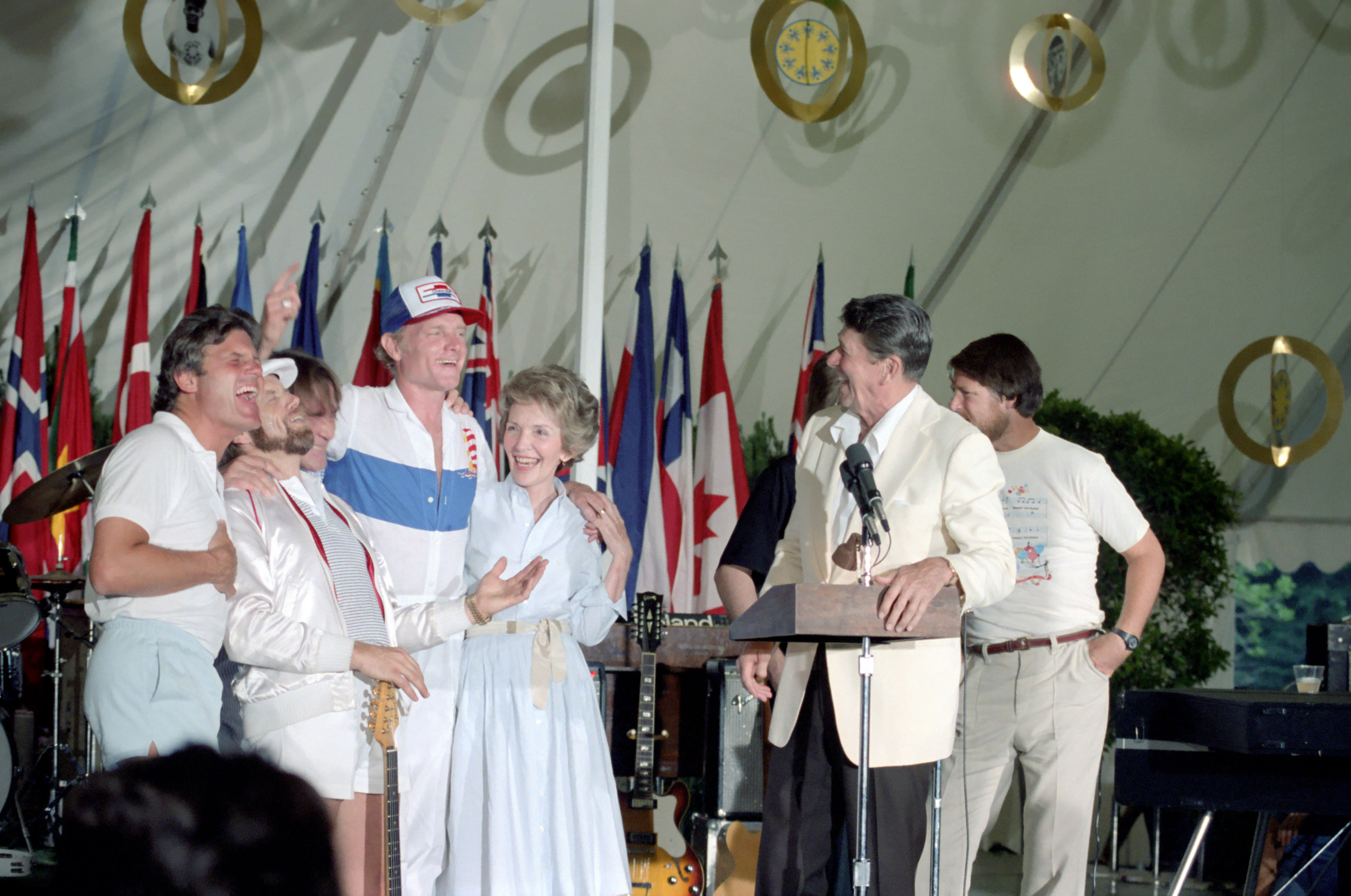
The Beach Boys with Ronald Reagan and Nancy Reagan at the White House, June 12, 1983

Love describes his politics as generally aligned with progressivism. However, a photographed handshake between him and Ronald Reagan in the 1980s, and his longtime friendship with Donald Trump, has led many to label him as a conservative. Love responded that being friendly with someone does not imply endorsing all of that person's opinions. Notwithstanding the friendly relationship between the Beach Boys and George H. W. Bush for many years, in 1992 the band raised money for the Transcendental Meditation–backed Natural Law Party. At the time, Love announced he was switching his support from Bush to Natural Law Party candidate John Hagelin.

In 1985, Love donated $5,000 to the Parents Music Resource Center (PMRC) through his charity, the Love Foundation. Carl Wilson and Bruce Johnston both disagreed with Love donating to the organization.

In 2018, Love praised Trump for his "support of music historically" and was present at the signing of the Music Modernization Act in October. After Trump's election, the Beach Boys were asked to perform in the festivities for 2017 Trump's inauguration, and Love initially responded positively, saying Trump had "been a friend for a long time. Does that mean I agree with everything he says? No. But... if we were asked [to play his inauguration], I'm sure that we would." Instead, during the evening of Trump's inauguration day, Love's Beach Boys performed at the Texas State Society's "Black Tie & Boots" Inaugural Ball.

In February 2020, Brian Wilson and Jardine's official social media pages encouraged fans to boycott the band's music on animal rights grounds, after it was announced that Love's Beach Boys would perform at a convention for the hunting advocacy group Safari Club International. The concert proceeded despite online protests; Love issued a statement that his group has always supported "freedom of thought and expression as a fundamental tenet of our rights as Americans." In October 2020, Love's Beach Boys agreed to play as the headliner at an expensive fundraiser for Trump's reelection campaign in Newport Beach. In a press release, Wilson and Jardine disavowed the use of the Beach Boys' name and music at the event, stating "we have absolutely nothing to do with the Trump benefit today in Newport Beach. Zero." Love again played at Mar-a-Lago's New Year's Eve celebration that year, alongside other acts. In 2022, Love attended the Conservative Political Action Conference (CPAC).

=== Charity ===
Love has been a longtime supporter of environmental causes and was among speakers at the Earth Summit in Rio de Janeiro in 1992 and Earth Day 2000 in Washington, DC. He was instrumental in forming StarServe ("Students Taking Action and Responsibility to Serve"), which enlisted high-profile celebrities to inspire America's youth to help serve their communities. He also created the Love Foundation, which supports national environmental and educational initiatives. Love personally donated $100,000 to the American Red Cross to benefit the victims of Hurricane Katrina and helped the foundation raise an additional $250,000. He has served as a member of the board of directors of the Lake Tahoe School in Incline Village, Nevada, and was responsible for raising over $1 million to benefit the school.

In 2010, Love contributed to the Juvenile Diabetes Research Foundation's More Hope For The Holidays album with vocals on "Closing of the Year" as well as contributing his self-penned "Santa's Goin' To Kokomo". On the album he appears alongside Weezer, Brandi Carlile, and Creedence Clearwater Revisited. Proceeds benefit the Juvenile Diabetes Research Foundation. He performed a benefit concert for the foundation for the Children of the Californias which raised one million dollars to support the expansion of three new surgical suites. During the 50th Reunion Tour, Love, alongside the Beach Boys, partnered with Operation Smile to raise funds for those in need of cleft lip and palate repair surgeries. In May 2013, he was recognized for his decades of investment in education and national service by being awarded City Year's "Seven Generations Award".

== Awards and honors ==
- 2014: Society of Singers Lifetime Achievement Award.

== Discography ==
Studio albums

- 1981: Looking Back with Love
- 2017: Unleash the Love: Billboard Independent Albums – #37
- 2018: Reason for the Season: Billboard's Holiday Album Chart – #4, Top Album Sales - #39 and Independent Albums Chart – #6
- 2019: 12 Sides of Summer
- 2023: Mike Love, Not War (Free Digital Download, exclusive with purchase of Beach Boys tickets in 2023)

With Celebration

- 1978: Almost Summer: Music from the Original Motion Picture Score
- 1979: Celebration
- 1979: Disco Celebration

Other albums

- 1983: Rock 'N' Roll City (with Dean Torrence; credited as Mike & Dean)
- 1996: Catch a Wave (with Adrian Baker)
- 1998: Salute NASCAR (with Bruce Johnston, David Marks, and Adrian Baker)
- 2001: Summertime Cruisin (with Bruce Johnston and Adrian Baker)
- 2010: A Postcard from California (Al Jardine album featuring backing vocals from The Beach Boys on one song)
- Unreleased (studio album, recorded 1978): First Love
- Unreleased (studio album, recorded 1978): Country Love

Singles

- 1967: "Gettin' Hungry" b/w "Devoted to You" (both with Brian Wilson)
- 1978: "Almost Summer" b/w "Island Girl" (with Celebration) – #28 Billboard Hot 100
- 1978: "It's Ok" b/w "Lookin' Good" (with Celebration)
- 1979: "Starbaby" b/w "Getting Hungry" (with Celebration)
- 1981: "Looking Back with Love" b/w "One Good Reason"
- 1981: "Runnin' Around the World" b/w "One Good Reason"
- 1982: "Be My Baby" b/w "Teach Me Tonight"
- 1982: "Be True to Your Bud" b/w "Be True to Your Bud" (Instrumental) (with Dean Torrence; credited as Mike & Dean)
- 1982: "Da Doo Ron Ron"/"Baby Talk"—Hitbound Records – HR-101A (both with Dean Torrence; credited as Mike & Dean) Single from their Radio Shack LP album
- 1983: "Jingle Bell Rock" b/w "Let's Party" (both with Dean Torrence; credited as Mike & Dean)
- 1983: "Jingle Bells" by Paul Revere & the Raiders b/w "Jingle Bell Rock" (with Dean Torrence; credited as Mike & Dean)
- 2006: "Santa's Goin' to Kokomo"
- 2007: "Hungry Heart"
- 2015: "(You'll Never Be) Alone on Christmas Day"
- 2017: "Do It Again" (with Mark McGrath & John Stamos)
- 2017: "Unleash the Love"
- 2017: "All the Love in Paris" (with Dave Koz)
- 2017: "Darlin'" (with AJR)
- 2018: "It's OK" (with Hanson)
- 2020: "This Too Shall Pass" (with John Stamos)

== Bibliography ==
- Badman, Keith (2004). The Beach Boys: The Definitive Diary of America's Greatest Band, on Stage and in the Studio. Backbeat Books. ISBN 978-0-87930-818-6.
- Carlin, Peter Ames (2006). Catch a Wave: The Rise, Fall, and Redemption of the Beach Boys' Brian Wilson. Rodale. ISBN 978-1-59486-320-2.
- Dorst, Melodye (1997) [1994]. "Up Close and Personal with Mike Love: An Interview by Melodye Dorst". In Abbott, Kingsley (ed.). Back to the Beach: A Brian Wilson and the Beach Boys Reader (1st ed.). London: Helter Skelter. pp. 213–217. ISBN 978-1-900924-02-3.
- Gaines, Steven (1986). Heroes and Villains: The True Story of The Beach Boys. New York: Da Capo Press. ISBN 0-306-80647-9.
- Love, Mike; Hirsch, James S. (2016). Good Vibrations: My Life as a Beach Boy. Penguin Publishing Group. ISBN 978-0-698-40886-9.
- McKeen, William (2017). Everybody Had an Ocean: Music and Mayhem in 1960s Los Angeles. Chicago Review Press. ISBN 978-1-61373-494-0.
- Morgan, Johnny (2015). The Beach Boys: America's Band. New York, NY: Sterling. ISBN 978-1-4549-1709-0.
- Murphy, James B. (2015). Becoming the Beach Boys, 1961-1963. McFarland & Company, Inc. ISBN 978-0-7864-7365-6.
- Priore, Domenic (2005). Smile: The Story of Brian Wilson's Lost Masterpiece. London: Sanctuary. ISBN 1-86074-627-6.
- Shumsky, Susan (2018). Maharishi & Me: Seeking Enlightenment with the Beatles' Guru. New York, NY: Skyhorse Publishing. ISBN 978-1-5107-2268-2.
- Tobler, John (1978). The Beach Boys. Chartwell Books. ISBN 0-89009-174-9.
- White, Timothy (1996). The Nearest Faraway Place: Brian Wilson, the Beach Boys, and the Southern Californian Experience. Macmillan. ISBN 0333649370.
