= List of UK top-ten singles in 1987 =

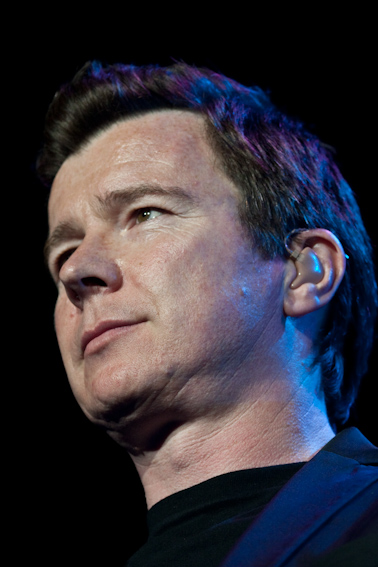
Rick Astley (pictured in 2009) had the best-selling single of 1987 with his debut record "Never Gonna Give You Up", which spent five weeks at number-one. Astley achieved two more top 10 entries during the year.

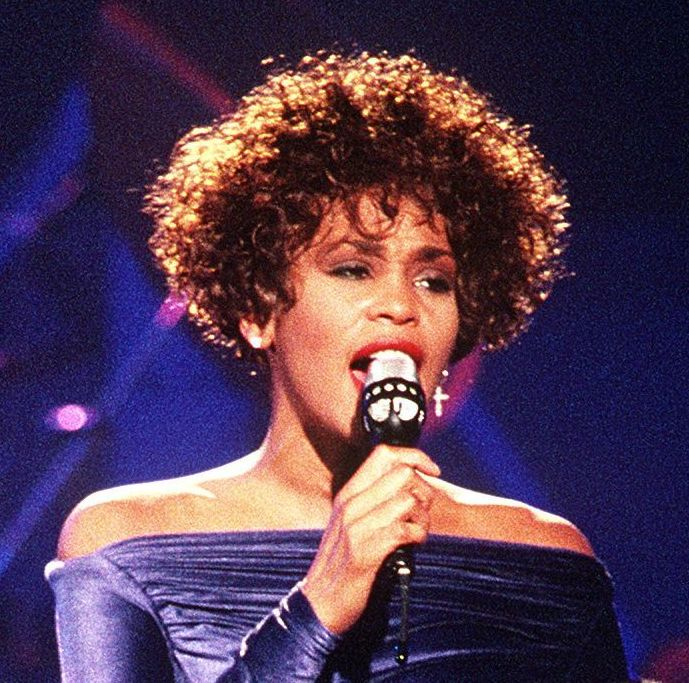
Whitney Houston (pictured in 1991) had two top singles in the UK this year, including "I Wanna Dance with Somebody (Who Loves Me)", which topped the chart for two weeks and became the third best selling single of the year.

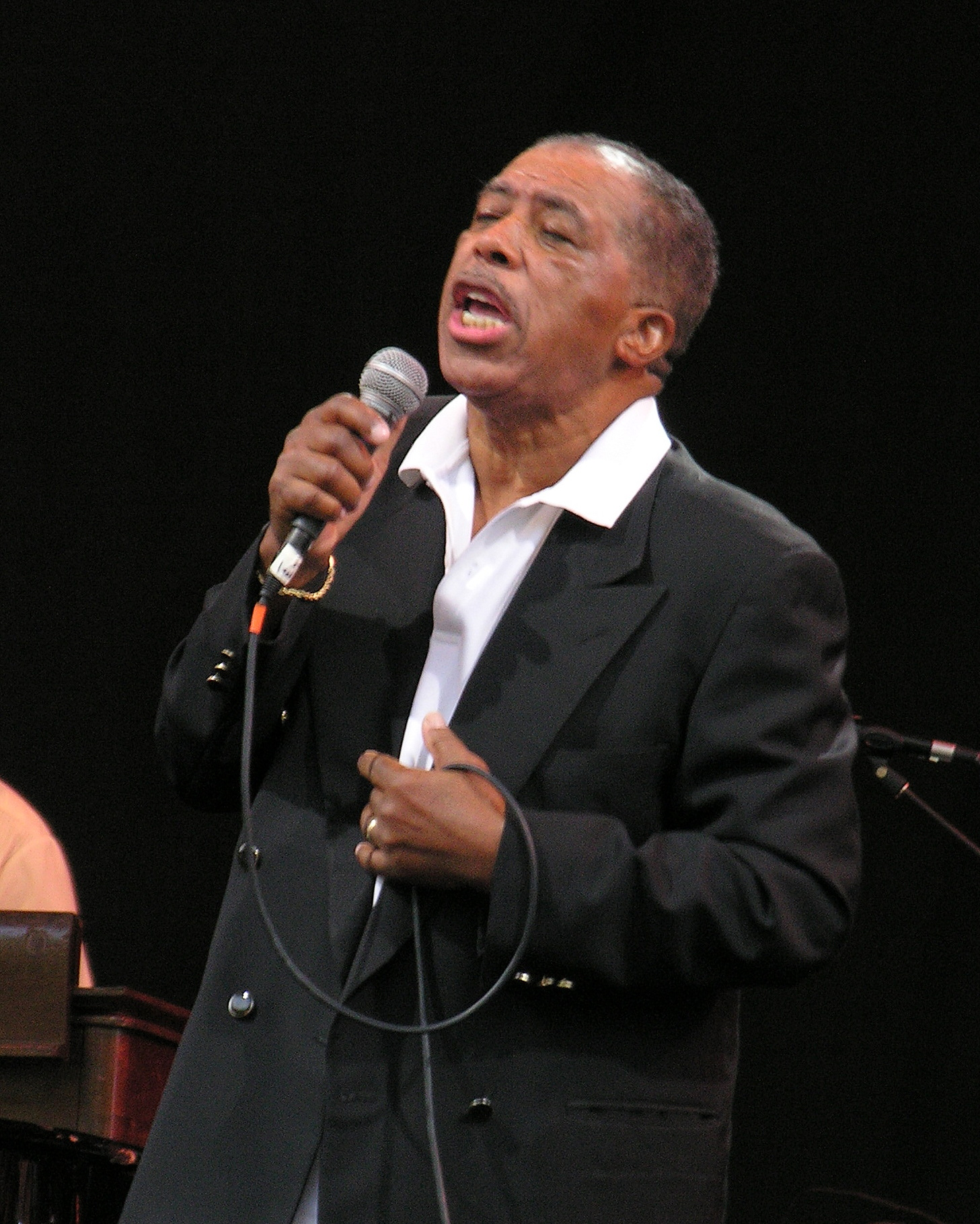
Ben E. King (pictured in 2007) reached number-one in the UK in February 1987 with the reissue of his signature song "Stand by Me". The song's renewed success was due to its use as the theme song from the movie of the same name and also in an advertisement for Levi's Jeans. Upon its original release in 1961, "Stand by Me" peaked at number 27 in the UK.

The UK Singles Chart is one of many music charts compiled by the Official Charts Company that calculates the best-selling singles of the week in the United Kingdom. Before 2004, the chart was only based on the sales of physical singles. This list shows singles that peaked in the Top 10 of the UK Singles Chart during 1987, as well as singles which peaked in 1986 and 1988 but were in the top 10 in 1987. The entry date is when the single appeared in the top 10 for the first time (week ending, as published by the Official Charts Company, which is six days after the chart is announced).

One-hundred and fifty-three singles were in the top ten in 1987. Ten singles from 1986 remained in the top 10 for several weeks at the beginning of the year, while "Heaven is a Place on Earth" by Belinda Carlisle and "When I Fall in Love" by Nat King Cole were both released in 1987 but did not reach their peak until 1988. "Cry Wolf" by A-ha and "Is This Love?" by Alison Moyet were the singles from 1986 to reach their peak in 1987. Thirty-five artists scored multiple entries in the top 10 in 1987. Beastie Boys, LL Cool J, The Pogues, Rick Astley and Wet Wet Wet were among the many artists who achieved their first UK charting top 10 single in 1987.

The 1986 Christmas number-one, "Reet Petite" by Jackie Wilson, remained at number-one for the first three weeks of 1987. The first new number-one single of the year was "Jack Your Body" by Steve "Silk" Hurley. Overall, nineteen different singles peaked at number-one in 1987, with Madonna and the Pet Shop Boys (2) having the joint most singles hit that position.

== Background ==
=== Multiple entries ===
One-hundred and fifty-three singles charted in the top 10 in 1987, with one-hundred and forty-three singles reaching their peak this year. Two songs were recorded by several artists with each version reaching the top 10:

- "I Found Lovin'" – Fatback Band, Steve Walsh
- "When I Fall in Love" – Nat King Cole, Rick Astley

Thirty-five artists scored multiple entries in the top 10 in 1987. Madonna secured the record for most top 10 hits in 1987 with five hit singles.

Boy George was one of a number of artists with two top-ten entries, including the number-one single "Everything I Own". A-ha, Curiosity Killed the Cat, Fleetwood Mac, The Pogues and Wet Wet Wet were among the other artists who had multiple top 10 entries in 1987.

=== Chart debuts ===
Sixty-six artists achieved their first top 10 single in 1987, either as a lead or featured artist. Of these, ten went on to record another hit single that year: Black, Bruce Willis, Curiosity Killed the Cat, Mirage, The Pogues, Taffy, Terence Trent D'Arby, T'Pau, Wet Wet Wet and Whitesnake. Pepsi & Shirlie and Rick Astley both had two other entries in their breakthrough year.

The following table (collapsed on desktop site) does not include acts who had previously charted as part of a group and secured their first top 10 solo single.

Artist	Number of top 10s	First entry	Chart position	Other entries
Steve "Silk" Hurley	1	"Jack Your Body"	1	—
Robbie Nevil	1	"C'est la Vie"	3	—
Swing Out Sister	1	"Surrender"	7	—
Iggy Pop	1	Real Wild Child (Wild One)	10	—
Pepsi & Shirlie	3	"Heartache"	2	"Let It Be" (1), "Goodbye Stranger" (9)
Curiosity Killed the Cat	2	"Down to Earth"	3	"Misfit" (7)
Taffy	2	"I Love My Radio"	6	"Let It Be" (1)
Man 2 Man	1	"Male Stripper"	4	—
Man Parrish	1	"Male Stripper"	4	—
The Blow Monkeys	1	"It Doesn't Have to Be This Way"	7	—
Michael Crawford	1	"The Music of the Night"/"Wishing You Were Somehow Here Again"	7	—
Mental As Anything	1	"Live It Up"	3	—
The Jets	1	"Crush on You"	5	—
Bruce Willis	2	"Respect Yourself"	7	"Under the Boardwalk" (2)
Ferry Aid	1	"Let It Be"	1	—
Ruby Turner	1	"Let It Be"	1	—
Club Nouveau	1	"Lean on Me"	3	—
Terence Trent D'Arby	2	"If You Let Me Stay"	7	"Wishing Well" (4)
The Pogues	2	"The Irish Rover"	8	"Fairytale of New York" (2)
Judy Boucher	1	"Can't Be with You Tonight"	2	—
Living in a Box	1	"Living in a Box"	5	—
Starship	1	"Nothing's Gonna Stop Us Now"	1	—
Labi Siffre	1	"(Something Inside) So Strong"	4	—
The Jesus and Mary Chain	1	"April Skies"	8	—
Johnny Hates Jazz	1	"Shattered Dreams"	5	—
Mirage	2	"Jack Mix II/III"	4	"Jack Mix IV" (8)
Wet Wet Wet	2	"Wishing I Was Lucky"	6	"Sweet Little Mystery" (5)
Donna Allen	1	"Serious"	8	—
The Firm	1	"Star Trekkin'"	1	—
John Farnham	1	"You're the Voice"	6	—
Whitesnake	2	"Is This Love"	9	"Here I Go Again" (9)
Black	2	"Sweetest Smile"	8	"Wonderful Life" (8)
Heart	1	"Alone"	3	—
Los Lobos	1	"La Bamba"	1	—
Boogie Box High	1	"Jive Talkin'"	7	—
Freddie McGregor	1	"Just Don't Want to Be Lonely"	9	—
Beastie Boys	1	"She's on It"	10	—
Siedah Garrett	1	"I Just Can't Stop Loving You"	1	—
Hue and Cry	1	"Labour of Love"	6	—
Spagna	1	"Call Me"	2	—
Def Leppard	1	"Animal"	6	—
Rick Astley	3	"Never Gonna Give You Up"	1	"Whenever You Need Somebody" (3), "When I Fall in Love" (2)
Linda Ronstadt	1	"Somewhere Out There"	8	—
James Ingram	1	"Somewhere Out There"	8	—
Pseudo Echo	1	"Funkytown"	8	—
The Fat Boys	1	"Wipe Out"	2	—
T'Pau	2	"Heart and Soul"	4	"China in Your Hand" (1)
LeVert	1	"Casanova"	9	—
M|A|R|R|S	1	"Pump Up the Volume"/"Anitina (The First Time I See She Dance)"	1	—
House Master Boyz	1	"House Nation"	8	—
The Rude Boy of House	1	"House Nation"	8	—
Karel Fialka	1	"Hey Matthew"	9	—
Abigail Mead	1	"Full Metal Jacket (I Wanna Be Your Drill Instructor)"	2	—
Nigel Goulding	1	"Full Metal Jacket (I Wanna Be Your Drill Instructor)"	2	—
LL Cool J	1	"I Need Love"	8	—
The Sisters of Mercy	1	"This Corrosion"	7	—
Kiss	1	"Crazy Crazy Nights"	4	—
Steve Walsh	1	"I Found Lovin'"	9	—
Was (Not Was)	1	"Walk the Dinosaur"	10	—
Montserrat Caballé	1	"Barcelona"	8	—
Jennifer Warnes	1	"(I've Had) The Time of My Life"	6	—
The Proclaimers	1	"Letter from America"	3	—
Mel Smith	1	"Rockin' Around the Christmas Tree"	3	—
Jellybean	1	"Who Found Who"	10	—
Elisa Fiorillo	1	"Who Found Who"	10	—
Belinda Carlisle	1	"Heaven Is a Place on Earth" ^{[A]}	1	—

Notes

Al Jarreau had his first top 10 solo single in 1987 with the theme song to Moonlighting, charting at number 8, but he had made been a part of the "We Are the World" charity single by USA for Africa two years earlier.

Mark King was one of the featured artists on the Ferry Aid charity effort "Let It Be". His previous top 10 entries had all been as a member of Level 42. Similarly, Andy Bell of Erasure, Curiosity Killed the Cat's singer Ben Volpeliere-Pierrot, Paul King, who was in new wave band King, and Mark Knopfler from Dire Straits all sang lead vocals on this single, their first credits independent of their bands. Ruby Turner scored her first top 10 single as a credited singer, Taffy (one additional hit in her debut year) and Pepsi & Shirlie (this was one of 3 entries for the group this year). The other main acts on "Let It Be" who already had top 10 singles to their name were Boy George, Edwin Starr, Gary Moore, Jaki Graham, Kate Bush, Keren Woodward (of Bananarama), Kim Wilde, Mel and Kim, Nick Kamen and Nik Kershaw.

Bill Medley had his only top 10 single that wasn't as part of The Righteous Brothers in 1987, his duet with and theme from Dirty Dancing, "(I've Had) The Time of My Life" with Jennifer Warnes peaking at number six.

=== Songs from films ===
Original songs from various films entered the top 10 throughout the year. These included "It Doesn't Have to Be This Way" (from Police Academy 4: Citizens on Patrol), "Coming Around Again" (Heartburn), "Nothing's Gonna Stop Us Now" (Mannequin), "I Want Your Sex" (Beverley Hills Cop II), "The Living Daylights" (The Living Daylights), "Causing a Commotion", "The Look of Love" and "Who's That Girl" (Who's That Girl), "La Bamba" (La Bamba), "She's on It" (Krush Groove), "Somewhere Out There" (An American Tail) and "(I've Had) The Time of My Life" (Dirty Dancing).

Additionally, "Real Wild Child (Wild One)" appeared in several films at the end of the 1980s, including Adventures in Babysitting, Crocodile Dundee II, Problem Child and Problem Child 2. "When a Man Loves a Woman" was re-released to promote the soundtrack to Platoon. The original Bee Gees release of "Jive Talkin" from 1977 was included on the Saturday Night Fever soundtrack. "Full Metal Jacket (I Want to Be Your Drill Instructor)" featured a compilation of drill cadences from Full Metal Jacket and was used to promote the film.

=== Charity singles ===
A number of songs recorded for charity reached the top 10 in the charts in 1987. A group of popular artists united to raise money towards victims of the Zeebrugge Disaster. They released a version of "Let It Be" – originally by The Beatles – under the name Ferry Aid, reaching number-one for 3 weeks from 4 April 1987.

The Comic Relief single was a cover of the classic Christmas song "Rockin' Around the Christmas Tree" recording by Mel Smith and Kim Wilde, parodying the style of the singing duo Mel and Kim. The song peaked at number three on 26 December 1987.

=== Best-selling singles ===
Rick Astley had the best-selling single of the year with "Never Gonna Give You Up". The single spent nine weeks in the top 10 (including five weeks at number one), sold over 810,000 copies and was certified by the BPI. "Nothing's Gonna Stop Us Now" by Starship came in second place, selling more than 740,000 copies and losing out by around 70,000 sales. Whitney Houston's "I Wanna Dance with Somebody (Who Loves Me)", "You Win Again" from Bee Gees and "China in Your Hand" by T'Pau made up the top five. Singles by Mel and Kim, Ben E. King, Pet Shop Boys, The Firm and MARRS (stylized M|A|R|R|S) were also in the top ten best-selling singles of the year.

== Top-ten singles ==
Key

Symbol	Meaning
‡	Single peaked in 1986 but still in chart in 1987.
♦	Single released in 1987 but peaked in 1988.
(#)	Year-end top-ten single position and rank
Entered	The date that the single first appeared in the chart.
Peak	Highest position that the single reached in the UK Singles Chart.

Entered (week ending)	Weeks in top 10	Single	Artist	Peak	Peak reached (week ending)	Weeks at peak
Singles in 1986
22 November 1986	8	"The Final Countdown" ‡	Europe	1	6 December 1986	2
22 November 1986	7	"Livin' on a Prayer" ‡	Bon Jovi	4	6 December 1986	1
29 November 1986	8	"Sometimes" ‡	Erasure	2	13 December 1986	1
13 December 1986	6	"Caravan of Love" ‡	The Housemartins	1	20 December 1986	1
13 December 1986	5	"The Rain" ‡	Oran "Juice" Jones	4	13 December 1986	1
13 December 1986	5	"Shake You Down" ‡	Gregory Abbott	6	13 December 1986	1
13 December 1986	5	"Open Your Heart" ‡	Madonna	4	20 December 1986	3
20 December 1986	7	"Reet Petite" ‡ ^{[B]}	Jackie Wilson	1	27 December 1986	4
20 December 1986	4	"Cry Wolf"	A-ha	5	3 January 1987	2
27 December 1986	7	"Is This Love?"	Alison Moyet	3	10 January 1987	3
Singles in 1987
10 January 1987	3	"Big Fun"	The Gap Band	4	17 January 1987	1
17 January 1987	5	"Jack Your Body"	Steve "Silk" Hurley	1	24 January 1987	2
17 January 1987	4	"C'est la Vie"	Robbie Nevil	3	31 January 1987	1
17 January 1987	4	"No More the Fool"	Elkie Brooks	5	17 January 1987	3
17 January 1987	4	"Surrender"	Swing Out Sister	7	24 January 1987	1
17 January 1987	2	"Hymn to Her"	The Pretenders	8	17 January 1987	2
24 January 1987	1	"It Didn't Matter"	The Style Council	9	24 January 1987	1
24 January 1987	1	"Real Wild Child (Wild One)"	Iggy Pop	10	24 January 1987	1
31 January 1987	5	"I Knew You Were Waiting (For Me)"	George Michael & Aretha Franklin	1	7 February 1987	2
31 January 1987	5	"Heartache"	Pepsi & Shirlie	2	7 February 1987	2
31 January 1987	6	"Down to Earth"	Curiosity Killed the Cat	3	14 February 1987	3
31 January 1987	4	"Almaz"	Randy Crawford	4	7 February 1987	2
7 February 1987	2	"I Love My Radio"	Taffy	6	14 February 1987	1
14 February 1987	2	"It Doesn't Have to Be This Way"	The Blow Monkeys	5	14 February 1987	1
14 February 1987	1	"The Music of the Night"/"Wishing You Were Somehow Here Again"	Michael Crawford/Sarah Brightman	7	14 February 1987	1
14 February 1987	5	"Male Stripper"	Man 2 Man meets Man Parrish	4	28 February 1987	2
14 February 1987	1	"You Sexy Thing (Ben Liebrand Remix)"	Hot Chocolate	10	14 February 1987	1
21 February 1987	5	"Stand by Me" (#7) ^{[C]}	Ben E. King	1	21 February 1987	3
21 February 1987	5	"When a Man Loves a Woman" ^{[D]}	Percy Sledge	2	28 February 1987	2
21 February 1987	1	"Stay Out of My Life"	Five Star	9	21 February 1987	1
21 February 1987	4	"Running in the Family"	Level 42	6	7 March 1987	1
28 February 1987	5	"Live It Up"	Mental As Anything	3	7 March 1987	1
28 February 1987	4	"Crush on You"	The Jets	5	7 March 1987	1
28 February 1987	1	"Coming Around Again"	Carly Simon	10	28 February 1987	1
7 March 1987	5	"Everything I Own"	Boy George	1	14 March 1987	2
7 March 1987	5	"I Get the Sweetest Feeling" ^{[E]}	Jackie Wilson	3	14 March 1987	3
7 March 1987	5	"The Great Pretender"	Freddie Mercury	4	14 March 1987	2
14 March 1987	7	"Respectable" (#6)	Mel and Kim	1	28 March 1987	1
21 March 1987	4	"Weak in the Presence of Beauty"	Alison Moyet	6	28 March 1987	1
21 March 1987	1	"Moonlighting Theme"	Al Jarreau	8	21 March 1987	1
28 March 1987	4	"With or Without You"	U2	4	28 March 1987	2
28 March 1987	1	"Respect Yourself"	Bruce Willis	7	28 March 1987	1
28 March 1987	5	"Let's Wait Awhile"	Janet Jackson	3	4 April 1987	1
28 March 1987	1	"Sign o' the Times"	Prince	10	28 March 1987	1
4 April 1987	4	"Let It Be" ^{[F]}	Ferry Aid ^{[G]}^{[H]}	1	4 April 1987	3
4 April 1987	7	"La Isla Bonita"	Madonna	1	25 April 1987	2
4 April 1987	5	"Lean on Me"	Club Nouveau	3	18 April 1987	2
11 April 1987	4	"If You Let Me Stay"	Terence Trent D'Arby	7	11 April 1987	3
11 April 1987	1	"The Irish Rover"	The Pogues & The Dubliners	8	11 April 1987	1
11 April 1987	3	"Ever Fallen in Love"	Fine Young Cannibals	9	18 April 1987	1
18 April 1987	7	"Can't Be with You Tonight"	Judy Boucher	2	25 April 1987	4
18 April 1987	6	"Living in a Box"	Living in a Box	5	16 May 1987	1
25 April 1987	4	"The Slightest Touch"	Five Star	4	2 May 1987	1
2 May 1987	9	"Nothing's Gonna Stop Us Now" (#2)	Starship	1	9 May 1987	4
2 May 1987	6	"A Boy from Nowhere"	Tom Jones	2	23 May 1987	1
2 May 1987	4	"Another Step (Closer to You)"	Kim Wilde & Junior	6	16 May 1987	1
2 May 1987	1	"Sheila Take a Bow"	The Smiths	10	2 May 1987	1
9 May 1987	4	"(Something Inside) So Strong"	Labi Siffre	4	16 May 1987	2
9 May 1987	2	"April Skies"	The Jesus and Mary Chain	8	9 May 1987	1
9 May 1987	1	"To Be with You Again"	Level 42	10	9 May 1987	1
16 May 1987	2	"Big Love"	Fleetwood Mac	9	16 May 1987	2
23 May 1987	4	"Shattered Dreams"	Johnny Hates Jazz	5	23 May 1987	3
23 May 1987	2	"Incommunicado"	Marillion	6	23 May 1987	2
23 May 1987	8	"I Wanna Dance with Somebody (Who Loves Me)" (#3)	Whitney Houston	1	6 June 1987	2
30 May 1987	5	"Hold Me Now" ^{[I]}	Johnny Logan	2	13 June 1987	1
30 May 1987	3	"Jack Mix II/III"	Mirage	4	6 June 1987	1
30 May 1987	3	"Wishing I Was Lucky"	Wet Wet Wet	6	6 June 1987	1
6 June 1987	3	"Victim of Love"	Erasure	7	6 June 1987	1
6 June 1987	1	"Serious"	Donna Allen	8	6 June 1987	1
6 June 1987	2	"Goodbye Stranger"	Pepsi & Shirlie	9	13 June 1987	1
13 June 1987	4	"I Want Your Sex"	George Michael	3	20 June 1987	1
13 June 1987	2	"I Still Haven't Found What I'm Looking For"	U2	6	13 June 1987	1
20 June 1987	5	"Star Trekkin'" (#9)	The Firm	1	20 June 1987	2
20 June 1987	7	"Under the Boardwalk"	Bruce Willis	2	11 July 1987	2
20 June 1987	2	"Nothing's Gonna Stop Me Now"	Samantha Fox	8	20 June 1987	2
20 June 1987	4	"You're the Voice"	John Farnham	6	4 July 1987	1
27 June 1987	6	"It's a Sin" (#8)	Pet Shop Boys	1	4 July 1987	3
27 June 1987	3	"Misfit"	Curiosity Killed the Cat	7	4 July 1987	1
4 July 1987	4	"Wishing Well"	Terence Trent D'Arby	4	11 July 1987	2
4 July 1987	1	"Is This Love"	Whitesnake	9	4 July 1987	1
4 July 1987	2	"My Pretty One"	Cliff Richard	6	11 July 1987	1
11 July 1987	2	"The Living Daylights"	A-ha	5	11 July 1987	1
11 July 1987	6	"Always"	Atlantic Starr	3	25 July 1987	2
18 July 1987	5	"Who's That Girl"	Madonna	1	25 July 1987	1
18 July 1987	3	"F.L.M."	Mel and Kim	7	18 July 1987	2
18 July 1987	2	"Sweetest Smile"	Black	8	18 July 1987	1
18 July 1987	5	"Alone"	Heart	3	8 August 1987	1
25 July 1987	5	"La Bamba"	Los Lobos	1	1 August 1987	2
25 July 1987	3	"Jive Talkin'"	Boogie Box High ^{[J]}	7	1 August 1987	1
1 August 1987	1	"Just Don't Want to Be Lonely"	Freddie McGregor	9	1 August 1987	1
1 August 1987	2	"She's on It"	Beastie Boys	10	1 August 1987	2
8 August 1987	5	"I Just Can't Stop Loving You"	Michael Jackson with Siedah Garrett	1	15 August 1987	2
8 August 1987	2	"Labour of Love"	Hue and Cry	6	8 August 1987	2
8 August 1987	4	"True Faith"	New Order	4	15 August 1987	1
8 August 1987	5	"Call Me"	Spagna	2	22 August 1987	1
15 August 1987	3	"Animal"	Def Leppard	6	22 August 1987	1
15 August 1987	6	"Toy Boy"	Sinitta	4	22 August 1987	3
22 August 1987	9	"Never Gonna Give You Up" (#1)	Rick Astley	1	29 August 1987	5
22 August 1987	2	"Somewhere Out There"	Linda Ronstadt & James Ingram	8	22 August 1987	1
22 August 1987	4	"Sweet Little Mystery"	Wet Wet Wet	5	5 September 1987	1
22 August 1987	5	"What Have I Done to Deserve This?"	Pet Shop Boys with Dusty Springfield	2	29 August 1987	2
29 August 1987	2	"Funkytown"	Pseudo Echo	8	29 August 1987	1
5 September 1987	4	"Wipe Out"	The Fat Boys & The Beach Boys	2	12 September 1987	1
5 September 1987	2	"Wonderful Life"	Black	8	5 September 1987	1
5 September 1987	4	"Heart and Soul"	T'Pau	4	19 September 1987	1
12 September 1987	2	"Where the Streets Have No Name"	U2	4	12 September 1987	1
12 September 1987	5	"Some People"	Cliff Richard	3	26 September 1987	1
12 September 1987	2	"Casanova"	LeVert	9	19 September 1987	1
19 September 1987	6	"Pump Up the Volume"/"Anitina (The First Time I See She Dance)" (#10)	M|A|R|R|S	1	3 October 1987	2
19 September 1987	4	"Causing a Commotion"	Madonna	4	26 September 1987	1
26 September 1987	4	"Bad"	Michael Jackson	3	3 October 1987	2
26 September 1987	2	"House Nation"	The House Master Boyz & The Rude Boy of House	8	26 September 1987	2
26 September 1987	2	"Hey Matthew"	Karel Fialka	9	26 September 1987	1
26 September 1987	1	"It's Over"	Level 42	10	26 September 1987	1
3 October 1987	6	"Crockett's Theme"	Jan Hammer	2	24 October 1987	1
3 October 1987	4	"Full Metal Jacket (I Wanna Be Your Drill Instructor)"	Abigail Mead & Nigel Goulding	2	10 October 1987	2
3 October 1987	3	"I Need Love"	LL Cool J	8	17 October 1987	1
10 October 1987	7	"You Win Again" (#4)	Bee Gees	1	17 October 1987	4
10 October 1987	1	"This Corrosion"	The Sisters of Mercy	7	10 October 1987	1
17 October 1987	3	"Crazy Crazy Nights"	Kiss	4	24 October 1987	1
17 October 1987	2	"I Found Lovin'"	Fatback Band	7	17 October 1987	1
17 October 1987	1	"I Found Lovin'"	Steve Walsh	9	17 October 1987	1
24 October 1987	4	"Love in the First Degree"	Bananarama	3	31 October 1987	1
24 October 1987	2	"The Circus"	Erasure	6	31 October 1987	1
24 October 1987	3	"Mony Mony"	Billy Idol	7	31 October 1987	1
24 October 1987	4	"Faith"	George Michael	2	31 October 1987	2
31 October 1987	3	"Little Lies"	Fleetwood Mac	5	31 October 1987	1
31 October 1987	1	"Rent"	Pet Shop Boys	8	31 October 1987	1
31 October 1987	2	"Walk the Dinosaur"	Was (Not Was)	10	31 October 1987	2
7 November 1987	5	"Whenever You Need Somebody"	Rick Astley	3	7 November 1987	3
7 November 1987	9	"China in Your Hand" (#5)	T'Pau	1	14 November 1987	5
7 November 1987	6	"Got My Mind Set on You"	George Harrison	2	14 November 1987	4
14 November 1987	4	"Never Can Say Goodbye"	The Communards	4	21 November 1987	2
14 November 1987	2	"Barcelona"	Freddie Mercury & Montserrat Caballé	8	14 November 1987	1
14 November 1987	4	"(I've Had) The Time of My Life"	Bill Medley & Jennifer Warnes	6	21 November 1987	2
21 November 1987	2	"My Baby Just Cares for Me" ^{[K]}	Nina Simone	5	21 November 1987	1
21 November 1987	1	"Jack Mix IV"	Mirage	8	21 November 1987	1
21 November 1987	3	"So Emotional"	Whitney Houston	5	28 November 1987	1
28 November 1987	3	"Criticize"	Alexander O'Neal	4	5 December 1987	1
28 November 1987	2	"Here I Go Again '87"	Whitesnake	9	28 November 1987	1
28 November 1987	3	"Letter from America"	The Proclaimers	3	5 December 1987	1
5 December 1987	4	"What Do You Want to Make Those Eyes at Me For?"	Shakin' Stevens	5	12 December 1987	1
12 December 1987	4	"When I Fall in Love"	Rick Astley	2	12 December 1987	2
12 December 1987	5	"The Way You Make Me Feel"	Michael Jackson	3	12 December 1987	3
12 December 1987	6	"Always on My Mind" ^{[L]}	Pet Shop Boys	1	19 December 1987	4
12 December 1987	5	"Love Letters"	Alison Moyet	4	19 December 1987	1
12 December 1987	1	"Once Upon a Long Ago"	Paul McCartney	10	12 December 1987	1
19 December 1987	4	"Rockin' Around the Christmas Tree" ^{[M]}	Comic Relief presents Mel & Kim (performed by Mel Smith & Kim Wilde) ^{[N]}	3	26 December 1987	2
19 December 1987	4	"Fairytale of New York"	The Pogues featuring Kirsty MacColl	2	26 December 1987	2
19 December 1987	1	"The Look of Love"	Madonna	9	19 December 1987	1
19 December 1987	1	"Who Found Who"	Jellybean featuring Elisa Fiorillo	10	19 December 1987	1
26 December 1987	2	"When I Fall in Love" ♦ ^{[O]}	Nat King Cole	4	2 January 1988	1
26 December 1987	7	"Heaven Is a Place on Earth" ♦	Belinda Carlisle	1	16 January 1988	2

== Entries by artist ==
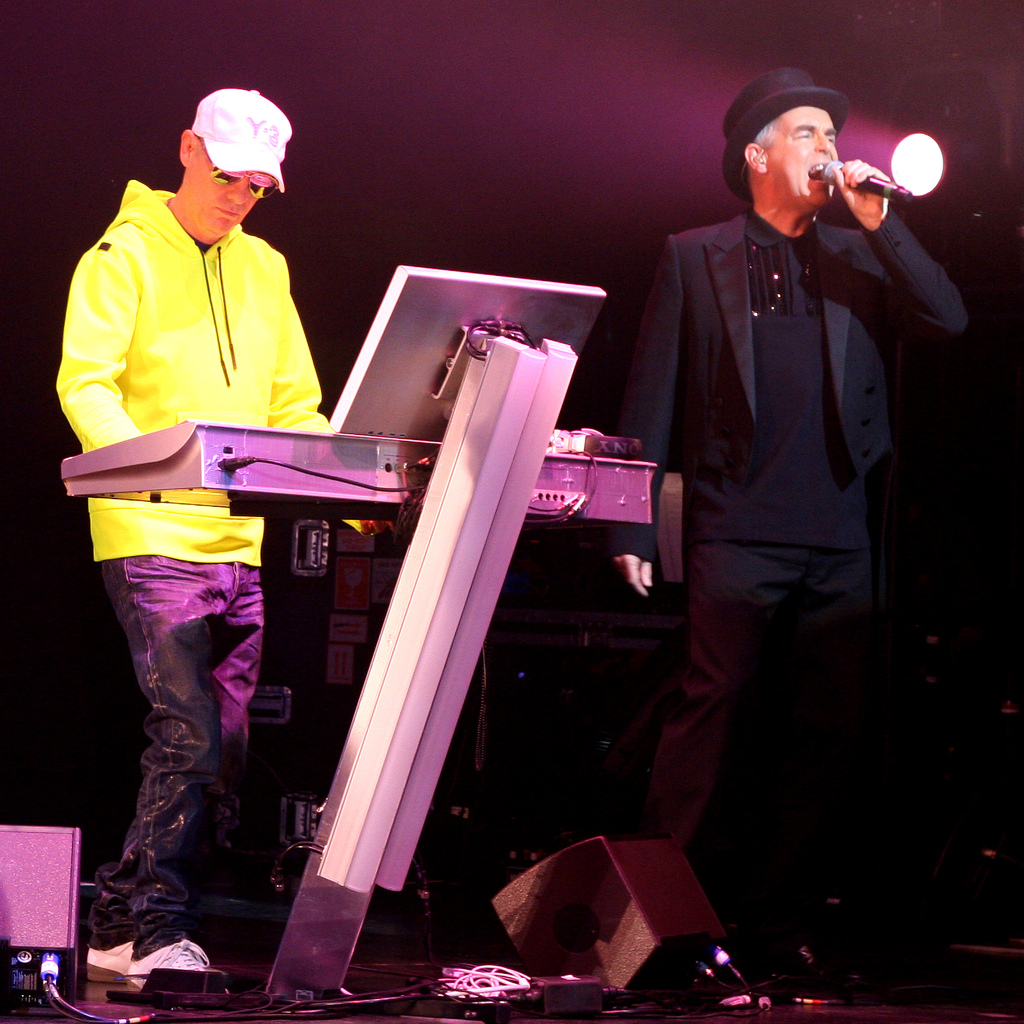
The Pet Shop Boys (pictured in 2006) were one of the most successful acts of this year, achieving four UK top 10 singles, including the number-ones "It's a Sin" and "Always on My Mind".

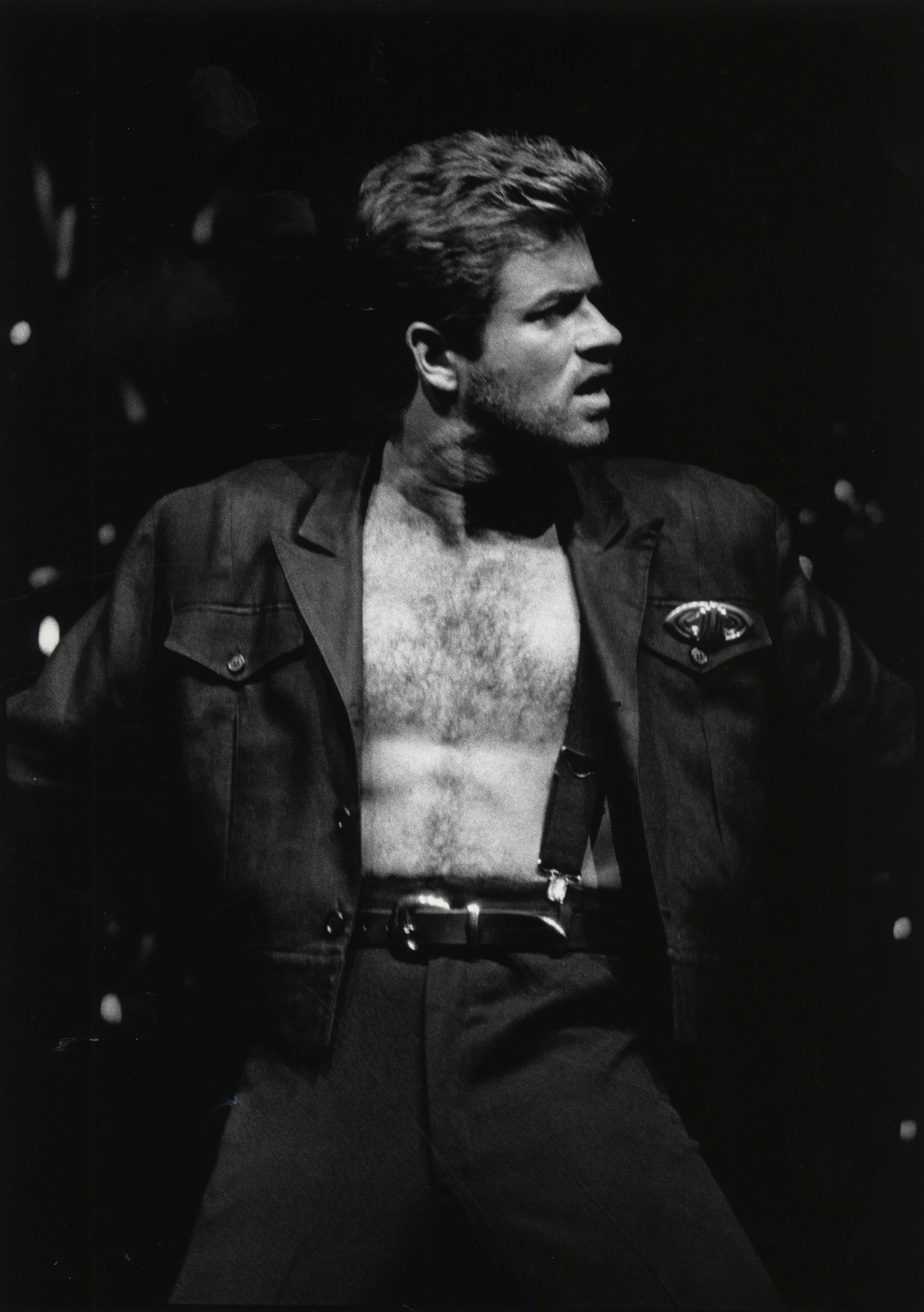
George Michael proved to be another of 1987's biggest music acts, scoring three UK top 10 entries, all of them making the top three. The highest-charting of these was his collaboration with Aretha Franklin, "I Knew You Were Waiting (For Me)", which reached number-one in February.

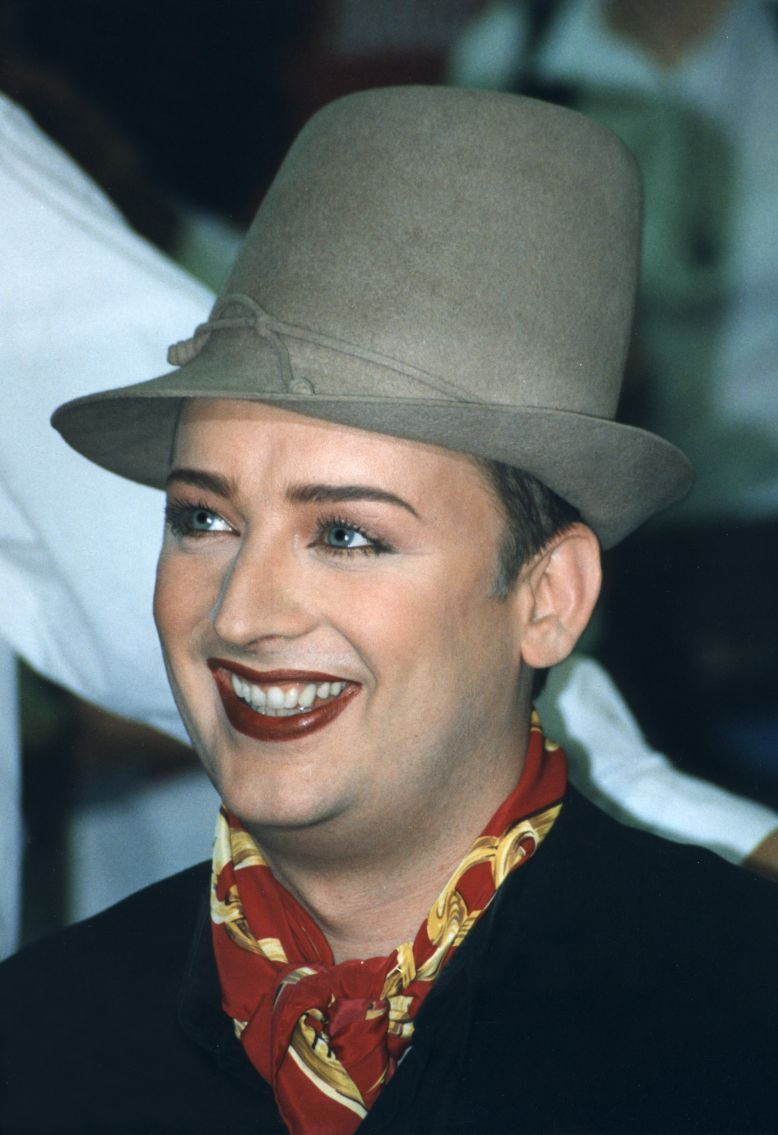
Culture Club's lead singer Boy George had his biggest hit as a solo artist this year with his cover version of "Everything I Own", which spent two weeks at number-one in March.

The following table shows artists who achieved two or more top 10 entries in 1987, including singles that reached their peak in 1986. The figures include both main artists and featured artists, while appearances on ensemble charity records are also counted for each artist.

Entries	Artist	Weeks	Singles
5	Madonna ^{[P]}	19	"Causing a Commotion", "La Isla Bonita", "Open Your Heart", "The Look of Love", "Who's That Girl"
4	Andy Bell ^{[P]}^{[Q]}^{[R]}	12	"Let It Be", "Sometimes", "The Circus", "Victim of Love"
4	Mark King ^{[Q]}^{[S]}	10	"It's Over", "Let It Be", "Running in the Family", "To Be with You Again"
4	Pet Shop Boys	15	"Always on My Mind", "It's a Sin", "Rent", "What Have I Done to Deserve This?"
3	Alison Moyet ^{[T]}	13	"Is This Love?", "Love Letters", "Weak in the Presence of Beauty"
3	Ben Volpeliere-Pierrot ^{[Q]}^{[U]}	9	"Down to Earth", "Let It Be", "Misfit"
3	Erasure ^{[P]}	8	"Sometimes", "The Circus", "Victim of Love"
3	George Michael	13	"Faith", "I Knew You Were Waiting (For Me)", "I Want Your Sex"
3	Kim Wilde ^{[R]}	10	"Another Step (Closer to You)", "Let It Be", "Rockin' Around the Christmas Tree"
3	Level 42	6	"It's Over", "Running in the Family", "To Be with You Again"
3	Mel and Kim ^{[Q]}	14	"F.L.M.", "Let It Be", "Respectable"
3	Michael Jackson	12	"Bad", "I Just Can't Stop Loving You", "The Way You Make Me Feel"
3	Pepsi & Shirlie ^{[Q]}	11	"Goodbye Stranger", "Heartache", "Let It Be"
3	Rick Astley	17	"Never Gonna Give You Up", "When I Fall in Love", "Whenever You Need Somebody", "When I Fall in Love"
3	U2	8	"I Still Haven't Found What I'm Looking For", "Where the Streets Have No Name", "With or Without You"
2	A-ha ^{[T]}	4	"Cry Wolf", "The Living Daylights"
2	Black	4	"Sweetest Smile", "Wonderful Life"
2	Boy George ^{[M]}	9	"Everything I Own", "Let It Be"
2	Bruce Willis	12	"Respect Yourself", "Under the Boardwalk"
2	Cliff Richard	7	"My Pretty One", "Some People"
2	Curiosity Killed the Cat	9	"Down to Earth", "Misfit"
2	Five Star	5	"Stay Out of My Life", "The Slightest Touch"
2	Fleetwood Mac	5	"Big Love", "Little Lies"
2	Freddie Mercury	7	"Barcelona", "The Great Pretender"
2	Jackie Wilson ^{[P]}	7	"I Get the Sweetest Feeling", "Reet Petite"
2	Keren Woodward ^{[Q]}^{[V]}	8	"Let It Be", "Love in the First Degree"
2	Mirage	4	"Jack Mix II/III", "Jack Mix IV"
2	Paul McCartney ^{[M]}	5	"Let It Be", "Once Upon a Long Ago"
2	The Pogues	3	"Fairytale of New York", "The Irish Rover"
2	T'Pau	12	"China in Your Hand", "Heart and Soul"
2	Taffy ^{[Q]}	6	"I Love My Radio", "Let It Be"
2	Terence Trent D'Arby	8	"If You Let Me Stay", "Wishing Well"
2	Wet Wet Wet	7	"Sweet Little Mystery", "Wishing I Was Lucky"
2	Whitesnake	3	"Here I Go Again", "Is This Love"
2	Whitney Houston	11	"I Wanna Dance with Somebody (Who Loves Me)", "So Emotional"

== Notes ==
- ^{a} "Heaven Is a Place on Earth" reached its peak of number-one on 16 January 1988 (week ending).
- ^{b} "Reet Petite" reached number-one in 1986 after being reissued, 29 years after its initial release and two years after Jackie Wilson's death. It originally peaked at number 6 in 1957. This was the longest gap between a song's release and it rising to the top of the charts until Tony Christie's "Is This the Way to Amarillo?" in 2005.
- ^{c} "Stand by Me" originally peaked outside the top 10 at number 27 upon its initial release in 1961. It was re-released in 1987 after being used in a television advertising campaign for Levi's jeans.
- ^{d} "When a Man Loves a Woman" originally peaked at number 4 upon its initial release in 1966. It was re-released in 1987 after being used in a television advertising campaign for Levi's jeans.
- ^{e} "I Get the Sweetest Feeling" originally peaked at number 9 on its initial release in 1972.
- ^{f} "Let It Be" was recorded to support relief efforts following the Zeebrugge Disaster.
- ^{g} Ferry Aid was a collective who recorded a cover version of The Beatles song "Let It Be" to benefit survivors and victims families affected by the Zeebrugge Disaster.
- ^{h} "Let It Be" had vocal contributions from more than 70 artists, but only those on lead vocals have this as a separate credit in the "Entries by artist" table. This includes Boy George, Keren Woodward (of Bananarama), Paul McCartney, Pepsi & Shirley and Taffy.
- ^{i} "Hold Me Now" was the Ireland's winning entry at the Eurovision Song Contest in 1987.
- ^{j} George Michael had uncredited lead vocals on Boogie Box High's "Jive Talkin'".
- ^{k} "My Baby Just Cares for Me" was used in a television advert for Chanel No. 5 in 1987. It was re-released as a single to capitalise on its popularity, having originally peaked at number 82 two years earlier, becoming Nina Simone's first top 10 hit in 18 years.
- ^{l} "Always on My Mind" was released after Pet Shop Boys covered the song on Love Me Tender, a programme marking ten years since the death of Elvis Presley.
- ^{m} Released as the official single for Comic Relief.
- ^{n} Comedian Mel Smith and singer Kim Wilde parodied their namesakes, the duo Mel and Kim, for the Comic Relief cover of "Rockin' Around the Christmas Tree". The song was recorded under the identical name, Mel & Kim.
- ^{o} "When I Fall in Love" (Nat King Cole version) originally peaked at number 2 on its initial release in 1957.
- ^{p} Figure includes single that peaked in 1986.
- ^{q} Figure includes an appearance on the Ferry Aid charity single "Let It Be" in aid of the Zeebrugge Disaster.
- ^{r} Figure includes three top 10 hits with the group Erasure.
- ^{s} Figure includes three top 10 hits with the group Level 42.
- ^{t} Figure includes single that first charted in 1986 but peaked in 1987.
- ^{u} Figure includes two top 10 hits with the group Curiosity Killed the Cat.
- ^{v} Figure includes a top 10 hit with the group Bananarama.

== See also ==
- 1987 in British music
- List of number-one singles from the 1980s (UK)
