= Greatest Hits Vol. 1 (Mental As Anything album) =

Greatest Hits Volume 1

Compilation album by Mental As Anything
- Released: April 1986
- Recorded: 1979–1985
- Genre: Rock, pop
- Label: CBS Records
- Producer: Mental As Anything

Mental As Anything chronology
Fundamental (1985)	Greatest Hits Volume 1 (1986)	Mouth to Mouth (1987)

Greatest Hits Volume 1 is the first compilation album by Australian pop rock band Mental As Anything, released in April 1986. Greatest Hits Volume 1 peaked at number 2 on the Australian chart and number 36 in New Zealand.

== Reception ==
Professional ratings
Review scores
Source	Rating
AllMusic	4.5/5 stars

Steve Schnee from AllMusic states: "This collection of singles was a perfect introduction to the Mentals' work up to that point (and what an optimistic title it is, too). Featuring all the recent hits from Fundamental as well as singles dating back to Get Wet, Greatest Hits, Vol. 1 is superb. If it's pure pop you're looking for, look no further than this."

== Track listing ==
No.	Title	Writer(s)	Originally from	Length
1.	"Live It Up"	Greedy Smith	Fundamental, 1985	3:46
2.	"The Nips Are Getting Bigger"	Martin Murphy	Get Wet, 1979	3:23
3.	"Too Many Times"	Andrew Greedy Smith	Cats & Dogs, 1981	2:48
4.	"Come Around"	Martin Plaza	Espresso Bongo, 1980	3:03
5.	"(Just Like) Romeo and Juliet"	Bob Hamilton, Freddie Gorman	Non-album single, 1980	2:08
6.	"Apocalypso (Wiping the Smile Off Santa's Face)"	Martin Plaza, Reg Mombassa	Non-album single, 1984	4:16
7.	"Berserk Warriors"	Peter O'Doherty	Cats & Dogs, 1981	3:49
8.	"If You Leave Me, Can I Come Too?"	Martin Plaza	Cats & Dogs, 1981	3:11
9.	"You're So Strong"	Andrew Greedy Smith	Fundamental, 1985	3:25
10.	"Working for the Man"	Roy Orbison	Non-album single, 1983	3:30
11.	"I Didn't Mean to Be Mean"	Martin Plaza	Non-album single, 1982	3:14
12.	"Spirit Got Lost"	Reg Mombassa, Andrew Greedy Smith	Creatures of Leisure, 1983	2:55
13.	"Brain Brain"	Peter O'Doherty	Creatures of Leisure, 1983	4:37
14.	"Egypt"	Reg Mombassa	Get Wet, 1979	3:26

== Personnel ==
- Martin Plaza – lead vocals, guitar
- Greedy Smith – lead vocals, keyboards, harmonica
- Reg Mombassa – guitar, vocals
- Peter O'Doherty – bass, vocals
- Wayne de Lisle – drums

== Charts ==
Chart (1986)	Peak position
Australian (Kent Music Report)	2
New Zealand Albums (RMNZ)	36

== Release history ==
Region	Date	Label	Format	Catalogue
Australia / New Zealand	April 1986	CBS	Vinyl LP, Cassette	SBP 8158
Australia	1992	Columbia	CD	CD450052
