= Ordinary Day (Curiosity Killed the Cat song) =

1987 single by Curiosity Killed the Cat

Single by Curiosity Killed the Cat

from the album Keep Your Distance
- B-side: "Bullet"
- Released: 23 March 1987
- Genre: Sophisti-pop
- Length: 3:53
- Label: Mercury
- Songwriters: Curiosity Killed the Cat; Toby Andersen
- Producer: Paul Staveley O'Duffy

Curiosity Killed the Cat singles chronology
"Down to Earth" (1986)	"Ordinary Day" (1987)	"Misfit (re-release)" (1987)

"Ordinary Day" is a song by English band Curiosity Killed the Cat, released in March 1987 by Mercury Records as the third single from their debut album Keep Your Distance. It peaked at number 11 on the UK Singles Chart.

== Reception ==
Reviewing for Record Mirror, Michelle Nicholasen wrote that "Ben Volpierre [sic] comes across as being a bit more daring than usual – stretching those chords in all directions – but alas, the uninspiring lyrics negate his vocal ambitions. Overall it's a strawberry-flavoured melange of thick drums and stringy spurts of trumpets, left to froth into a hard-to-swallow fluff". For Smash Hits, Barry McIlheney wrote that "Ordinary Day" "is actually more like the sort of insipid funk music that Curiosity Killed The Cat have been playing around the London clubs for the last couple of years, suggesting that "Down To Earth" was a bit of brilliant pop diversion from the norm. It does move along at a fair pace, however, and young Volauvent will no doubt leap around to it with enough style to take it well into the flingaway charts". However, Karen Swayne for Number One was more positive, writing that "it's clear they [Curiosity Killed the Cat] were born to be pop stars" and that "this single will certainly establish them as more than one-hit wonders".

== Track listings ==
7": Mercury / CAT 3 (UK)

1. "Ordinary Day" – 3:53
2. "Bullet" – 3:42

12": Mercury / CATX 3 (UK)

1. "Ordinary Day" (Extended Version) – 4:53
2. "Bullet" – 3:42
3. "Ordinary Day" (Dub Mix) – 3:40

12": Mercury / CATXR 3 (UK)

1. "Ordinary Day" (Extraordinary Mix) – 5:23
2. "Ordinary Day" (Ordinary Version) – 3:53
3. "Bullet" – 3:42

12": Mercury / 15PP-60 (Japan)

1. "Ordinary Day" (7" Version) – 3:54
2. "Ordinary Day" (Extended Version) – 4:50
3. "Down to Earth" – 3:51
4. "Down to Earth" (Extended Version) – 6:01

== Charts ==
=== Weekly charts ===
Chart (1987)	Peak position
Ireland (IRMA)	13
Italy (Musica e dischi)	9
Italy Airplay (Music & Media)	11
Netherlands (Single Top 100)	31
New Zealand (Recorded Music NZ)	42
Switzerland (Schweizer Hitparade)	24
UK Singles (OCC)	11
