= Keep Your Distance =

Studio album by Curiosity Killed the Cat
- Released: 27 April 1987; 3 August 1987 (US)
- Recorded: 1986–1987
- Genre: Sophisti-pop
- Length: 37:25; 63:58 (with original bonus tracks)
- Label: Mercury
- Producer: Stewart Levine (tracks 1, 2, 4, 7-9); Sly & Robbie (track 3); Pete Smith (track 5); Paul Staveley O'Duffy (track 6)

Curiosity Killed the Cat chronology
Keep Your Distance (1987)	Getahead (1989)

Singles from Keep Your Distance
- 1. "Misfit" Released: 8 August 1986; re-released in June 1987; 2. "Down to Earth" Released: 7 November 1986; 3. "Ordinary Day" Released: 23 March 1987; 4. "Free" Released: 7 September 1987

Professional ratings
Review scores
Source	Rating
AllMusic	2.5/5 stars
Number One	4/4 stars

Keep Your Distance is the debut album by the British band Curiosity Killed the Cat, released in April 1987. It debuted at #1 on the UK Albums Chart, and is their only album to chart on the Billboard 200, reaching #55.

== Track listing ==
All tracks are written by Curiosity Killed the Cat and Toby Andersen.

No.	Title	Length
1.	"Misfit"	4:03
2.	"Down to Earth"	4:19
3.	"Free"	4:00
4.	"Know What You Know"	3:50
5.	"Curiosity Killed the Cat"	3:20
6.	"Ordinary Day"	3:51
7.	"Mile High"	4:04
8.	"Red Lights"	5:33
9.	"Shallow Memory"	4:25
Total length:		37:25

Original CD bonus tracks
No.	Title	Length
10.	"Misfit" (Extended Version)	7:03
11.	"Down to Earth" (Extended Version)	5:58
12.	"Ordinary Day" (Extraordinary Mix)	5:22
13.	"Mile High" (Mile Long Mix)	8:10
Total length:		63:58

2010 reissue bonus tracks
No.	Title	Length
14.	"Bullet"	3:40
15.	"Man"	3:33
16.	"Corruption" (Dub)	5:26

== Charts ==
=== Weekly charts ===
Chart (1987)	Peak position
Australian Albums (Kent Music Report)	47
Austrian Albums (Ö3 Austria)	20
Dutch Albums (Album Top 100)	9
German Albums (Offizielle Top 100)	29
Icelandic Albums (Tónlist)	7
Italian Albums (FIMI)	8
New Zealand Albums (RMNZ)	19
Swedish Albums (Sverigetopplistan)	32
Swiss Albums (Schweizer Hitparade)	7
UK Albums (OCC)	1
US Billboard 200	55

=== Year-end charts ===
Chart (1987)	Peak position
Dutch Albums (Album Top 100)	63
Italian Albums (FIMI)	26
UK Albums (OCC)	24

== Certifications ==
Region	Certification	Certified units/sales
United Kingdom (BPI)	Platinum	300,000^{^}
^{^} Shipments figures based on certification alone.
