= Michael J McEvoy =

American musician (born 1961)

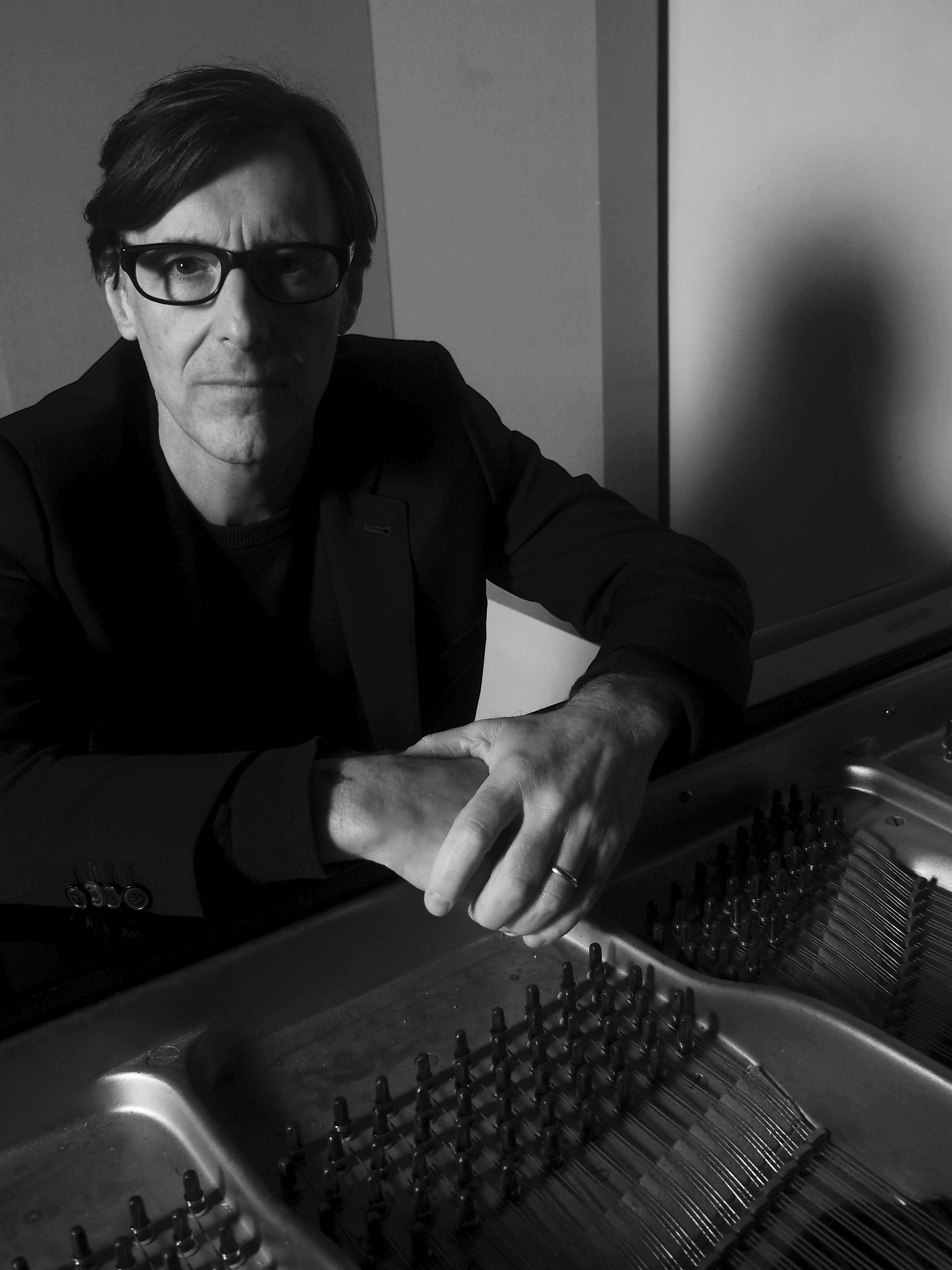
- McEvoy in 2017

Background information
- Born: August 29, 1961 (age 64)
- Origin: Nashville, Tennessee, U.S.
- Genres: Rock; film score; jazz; pop
- Occupations: Musician; orchestrator; composer
- Instruments: Keyboards; guitar; bass guitar; viola
- Years active: 1987–present
- Label: Rezzonator Music
- Formerly of: Traffic

Michael J McEvoy (born August 29, 1961) is an American screen composer, orchestrator and multi-instrumentalist.

== 1980s ==
As a session musician, writer and arranger, McEvoy worked on various projects with the producer Adam Kidron, including albums by Delta 5, Orange Juice, Scritti Politti and Ian Dury. In 1988, he met Curiosity Killed the Cat and joined the group for their second album, Getahead, as a co-writer and keyboard player. In 1989, he scored his first feature film, Vroom, (directed by Beeban Kidron starring Clive Owen and David Thewlis) followed by Bearskin in 1990 starring Tom Waits.

== 1990s ==
During the 1990s, McEvoy's credits as a songwriter included songs by Soul II Soul on their album Volume II: 1990 New Decade and the soul diva Teena Marie ("Since Day One" on Ivory). He co-produced the James Taylor Quartet album Supernatural Feeling and was the musical director on tours with Soul II Soul and Steve Winwood, playing keyboards, Hammond organ and guitar in the 1994 line-up when a reformed Traffic embarked on an 88-date tour of the US and Europe including performing at Woodstock '94.

== Film and TV work ==
Throughout the 1990s, McEvoy scored documentaries for TV channels in the US and the UK: PBS, A&E, C4, ITN and Discovery. Many of McEvoy's long form documentary work has been with the director Gary Johnstone, including ITN Factual's Battle of Hood and Bismarck and "Einstein's Big Idea" for the PBS Nova series. Other notable documentaries include BBC's Storyville: French Beauty, directed by Pascale Lamche. During this period he was nominated for regional Emmys in the US for Ryman: Mother Church of Country Music and Tennessee Yearbook, winning the latter in 2002.

In 2003, McEvoy attended The Royal College of Music, where he was the PRS Sir Arthur Bliss Memorial Scholar and gained a MMus in composition for screen. On graduating in July 2005, he was awarded the Joseph Horovitz Prize for Screen Composition, the first time it had been awarded since 2001. McEvoy then took on the role of area leader for the screen composition at The Royal College of Music, a post he held from September 2005 until August 2008.

In 2007, he worked closely as an orchestrator and co-writer with the DJ and producer Paul Oakenfold on the score for an award-winning Japanese anime feature Vexille, directed by Fumihiko Sori, and in the following year Overture Pictures' Nothing Like the Holidays directed by Alfredo De Villa. In 2008, McEvoy worked with the filmmaker Richard Linklater on Me and Orson Welles. McEvoy wrote original music and had an acting role playing Orson Welles' musical director.

In 2010, McEvoy scored two independent UK features, Forget Me Not and Just Inès. Other film music credits include a jazz track (under the pseudonym "The Freddie Carleone Quartet") used in the feature film Wild Target, a song co-written with Mary Leay ("Take me as I Could Be") in the film The Decoy Bride and additional music for the movie Wild Card.

Recent film work includes string arrangements on music cues and songs for the film and album project David Brent: Life on the Road, and the score for Finding Your Feet directed by Richard Loncraine for Entertainment One, released worldwide in February 2018.

McEvoy's television work has included the title music for series 3 of the British music TV series Live From Abbey Road, the score for a 20 part Nickelodeon TV series Summer in Transylvania, series 4 and 5 of the UK BAFTA-nominated BBC series Dani's House and series 5 of Young Dracula on CBBC. He also scored the music for the documentary series for National Geographic titled Alien Deep. In 2016, McEvoy composed the music on the 2-part ITV/PBS/Masterpiece Theatre drama Dark Angel, about the life of Victorian serial killer Mary Ann Cotton.

2018 documentaries included the Peabody Award winning The Jazz Ambassadors, a BBC4/PBS/Arte/ZDF co-production, The Queen's Coronation in Colour and Queen of the World for ITV/Oxford Films and HBO. McEvoy also composed the original score to Churchill and the Movie Mogul, premiered at the British Film Institute in January 2019.

In 2019, McEvoy's Mother Medusae was nominated for an Ivors Composer/Ivor Novello Award in the jazz composition for small ensemble category.

== Solo recordings ==
His third album. The Long Way Home, was released in March 2014 on his Rezzonator Music label.

Previous albums are Terra Cognita and Night Sea Journey. Terra Cognita was re-released in 2026, with 50% of profits going to environmental charities.
