= Let's Go to Paradise =

- 7 Inch Australian Single

Single by Mental As Anything

from the album Mouth to Mouth
- B-side: "My Hands Are Tied"
- Released: November 1986
- Studio: Rhinoceros Studios
- Genre: Rock
- Length: 3:19; 4:36 (Extended mix)
- Label: CBS Records; Epic Records
- Songwriter: Greedy Smith
- Producers: Richard Gottehrer, Jeffrey Lesser

Mental As Anything singles chronology
"Sloppy Croc" (1986)	"Let's Go to Paradise" (1986)	"He's Just No Good for You" (1987)

Music video
- "Let's Go To Paradise" on YouTube

Let's Go to Paradise is a song by Australian pop rock band Mental As Anything, released in November 1986. It was released as the first single from the band's sixth studio album, Mouth to Mouth. The song was written by Mental As Anything guitarist Greedy Smith and peaked at number 15 on the Australian charts.

== Track listings ==
Epic (EPC 650383 7)
No.	Title	Writer(s)	Length
1.	"Let's Go to Paradise"	Greedy Smith	3:19
2.	"My Hands Are Tired"	Martin Plaza, Greedy Smith, Peter O'Doherty, Reg Mombassa, Wayne de Lisle	4:54

UK 12" version
No.	Title	Writer(s)	Length
1.	"Let's Go To Paradise (Extended Version)"	Greedy Smith	4:36
2.	"My Hands Are Tied"	Martin Plaza, Greedy Smith, Peter O'Doherty, Reg Mombassa, Wayne de Lisle	4:54

Australian 12" version
No.	Title	Writer(s)	Length
1.	"Let's Go To Paradise (Extended Version)"	Greedy Smith	4:36
2.	"You're So Strong (Extended Version)"	Greedy Smith	5:29

== Personnel ==
- Martin Plaza – lead vocals, guitar
- Wayne de Lisle – drums
- Reg Mombassa – guitar, vocals
- Greedy Smith – lead vocals, keyboards, harmonica
- Peter O'Doherty – bass guitar, vocals

== Charts ==
Chart (1986)	Peak position
Australia (Kent Music Report)	15
