= Don't Tell Me Now (song) =

Single by Mental As Anything

from the album Mouth to Mouth
- B-side: "I'm Glad (Unexpected Version)"
- Released: September 1987
- Studio: Rhinoceros Studios
- Genre: Rock, pop
- Length: 3:58; 6:46 (Extended Mix)
- Label: CBS Records; Columbia Records; Epic Records
- Songwriter(s): Martin Plaza
- Producer(s): Richard Gottehrer

Mental As Anything singles chronology
"He's Just No Good for You" (1987)	"Don't Tell Me Now" (1987)	"Love Me Tender" (1987)

Music video
- "Don't Tell Me Now" on YouTube

"Don't Tell Me Now" is a song recorded by Australian rock band Mental As Anything, released in 1987 through the label CBS Records. It was released as the third and final single from the bands sixth studio album Mouth to Mouth. The song peaked at number 36 on the ARIA Charts and stayed in the charts for 20 weeks. It was written by Mental As Anything guitarist Martin Plaza.

== Track listings ==
CBS (651122 7)
No.	Title	Writer(s)	Length
1.	"Don't Tell Me Now"	Martin Plaza	3:58
2.	"I'm Glad" (Unexpected Version)	Peter O'Doherty	3:18

12" version
No.	Title	Writer(s)	Length
1.	"Don't Tell Me Now (Extended Mix)"	Martin Plaza	6:46
2.	"Don't Tell Me Now"	Martin Plaza	3:58
3.	"I'm Glad (Unexpected Version)"	Peter O'Doherty	3:18

== Personnel ==
- Martin Plaza – lead vocals, guitar
- Wayne de Lisle – drums
- Reg Mombassa – guitar, vocals
- Greedy Smith – lead vocals, keyboards, harmonica
- Peter O'Doherty – bass guitar, vocals

== Charts ==
Chart (1987)	Peak position
Australia (Australian Music Report)	36
