= Fundamental (Mental As Anything album) =

Fundamental (As Anything)

Studio album by Mental As Anything
- Released: 1 March 1985
- Recorded: 1984
- Studio: Rhinoceros Studios, Sydney, Australia
- Genre: Pop, new wave
- Length: 39:24
- Label: Regular Records
- Producer: Richard Gottehrer

Mental As Anything chronology
Creatures of Leisure (1983)	Fundamental (As Anything) (1985)	Greatest Hits Vol. 1 (1986)

Singles from Fundamental
- 1. "You're So Strong" Released: March 1985; 2. "Live It Up" Released: 31 May 1985; 3. "Date with Destiny" Released: September 1985; 4. "Big Wheel" Released: November 1985

Professional ratings
Review scores
Source	Rating
Allmusic	4/5 stars

Fundamental or Fundamental As Anything is the fifth studio album released by Australian rock/pop group, Mental As Anything. The album was produced by Richard Gottehrer and was released on Regular Records in March 1985. It peaked at No. 3 on the Australian Kent Music Report albums charts.

== Recording ==
The band had intended to use Gary Langan as producer as they admired his work with Art of Noise and were happy with the "wild" album he had planned. O'Doherty said, "He took on too much at the time and he got zonked out at all the stress and he pulled out something like five days before he was meant to be on the plane." The replacement was Richard Gottehrer, but they had to wait for a gap in his schedule, delaying the recording. O'Doherty said, "It’s too long because we’ve got four songwriters in the band and we ended up with over 30 songs demoed for Fundamental, more than enough for two albums."

Gottehrer thought "Live it Up" was the strongest single, adding, "It was pretty obvious. I loved that song. "You're So Strong" and "Date with Destiny" I thought were also singles." All three songs were written by Smith, and other writers in the band felt their songs received less attention.

== Reception ==
Cash Box magazine said "Another strong album from this powerhouse Australian band. Variety is the key here, as the music runs the gamut from the gritty sensualism of "Hold On" to the depth and richness of "Date with Destiny"'."

Trouser Press said, "As produced by Richard Gottehrer, the Mental's music has hit a certain stride that discourages zaniness (a shame), but their sound — still an Australian answer to Nick Lowe — is never less than bouncily appealing."

== Track listing ==
Fundamental (As Anything)
No.	Title	Writer(s)	Length
1.	"You're So Strong"	Andrew "Greedy" Smith	3:29
2.	"Big Wheel"	Martin Plaza	4:46
3.	"Live It Up"	Smith	4:14
4.	"Surf & Mull & Sex & Fun"	Peter O'Doherty	3:39
5.	"Good Friday"	Plaza	4:29
6.	"Date with Destiny"	Smith	3:04
7.	"Hold On"	O'Doherty	3:02
8.	"Stones of the Heart"	Reg Mombassa	3:22
9.	"I Just Wanna Be Happy"	Mombassa	3:28
10.	"Splashing"	Mombassa	3:20
11.	"Bus Ride"	Plaza	3:02

== Personnel ==
=== Musicians ===
- Martin Plaza — lead vocals, guitar
- Greedy Smith — lead vocals, keyboards, harmonica
- Reg Mombassa — guitar, vocals
- Peter O'Doherty — bass, guitar, vocals
- Wayne de Lisle — drums

=== Additional personnel ===
- Martin Armiger — guitar
- Mary Bradfield-Taylor — vocals
- Rick Chadwick — keyboards
- Sandi Chick — vocals
- Andrew Farriss — keyboards
- Mark Kennedy — percussion

=== Recording details ===
- Producer — Richard Gottehrer
- Engineer, mixing — Thom Panunzio
- Assistant — Allan Wright

=== Art work ===
- Art direction — Jana Hartig, Ken Smith, Sue Woollard
- Design — Martin Plaza, Greedy Smith (and cover design)
- Photography — Paula Clarke (cover photo), Paul Clarke, Hugh Hamilton, Frank Lindner (and sleeve photo), Francine McDougall

== Charts ==
=== Weekly chart ===
Chart (1985)	Peak position
Australian (Kent Music Report)	3
New Zealand Albums (RMNZ)	22

=== Year-end chart ===
Chart (1985)	Rank
Australian Albums (Kent Music Report)	11

== Certifications and sales ==
Region	Certification	Certified units/sales
Australia (ARIA)	2× Platinum	140,000^{^}
^{^} Shipments figures based on certification alone.

== Release history ==
Region	Date	Label	Format	Catalogue
Australia / New Zealand	March 1985	Regular Records	LP, Cassette	RRLP1212
Australia / New Zealand	12 May 1986	Festival	CD	D20208
United States	February 1986	Columbia	LP	BFC 40299
Netherlands	1987	Epic	LP, Cassette	EPC 450641
Australia	September 1989	Festival	CD	D20208
