= Name and Number =

1989 single by Curiosity Killed the Cat

Single by Curiosity Killed the Cat

from the album Getahead
- B-side: "Keep On Trying"
- Released: 4 September 1989
- Length: 3:59
- Label: Mercury; Phonogram
- Songwriters: Ben Volpeliere-Pierrot; Julian Godfrey Brookhouse; Nick Thorpe; Migi Drummond; Glenn Skinner; Michael John McEvoy
- Producer: Glenn Skinner

Curiosity Killed the Cat singles chronology
"Free" (1987)	"Name and Number" (1989)	"First Place" (1989)

Official audio
- "Name and Number" on YouTube

"Name and Number" (stylised on the single as "Name & No.") is a song by English band Curiosity Killed the Cat. Released as a single on 4 September 1989, the song peaked at number 14 on the UK Singles Chart.

== Background ==
"Name and Number" was recorded at Ridge Farm Studios just after Christmas 1988 and mixed at Rak Studios in January 1989. Along with the four band members, the session was augmented by Paul "Wix" Wickens and Molly Duncan (ex-Average White Band) on saxophone. The song was produced and mixed by Glenn Skinner with engineering by Glenn Skinner, Ren Swan, and Neil Brockbank.

== Track listings ==
7-inch, cassette, and mini-CD single

1. "Name and Number" – 3:59
2. "Keep On Trying" – 4:08

12-inch single

1. "Name and Number" (extended mix) – 5:32
2. "Name and Number" (A Schizo version) – 4:26
3. "Name and Number" (Club Sandwich mix) – 4:21
4. "Keep On Trying" – 4:38

CD single

1. "Name and Number"
2. "Name and Number" (Hanging On Person to Person)
3. "Keep On Trying"
4. "Name and Number" (Jazzy Dub version)

== Charts ==
Chart (1989)	Peak position
Europe (Eurochart Hot 100)	51
Ireland (IRMA)	16
Italy (Musica e dischi)	13
Italy Airplay (Music & Media)	6
Netherlands (Dutch Top 40)	24
Netherlands (Single Top 100)	31
UK Singles (Official Charts)	14

== Release history ==
Region	Date	Format(s)	Label(s)	Ref.
United Kingdom	4 September 1989	7-inch vinyl; 12-inch vinyl; CD; cassette	Mercury; Phonogram	
Japan	25 October 1989	Mini-CD	Mercury	

== Samples ==
- "Name and Number" was widely sampled in the chorus of "Ring Ring Ring (Ha Ha Hey)", a 1991 hit song by American hip hop group De La Soul. Jaheim's 2009 single "Ain't Leavin Without You" borrows a similar chorus. Little Mix's 2013 single "How Ya Doin?" is heavily based on it, with almost the same chorus and only changing the verses.
