= John O'Connor (musician) =

British musician and composer (born 1949)

- Also known as: Eko
- Born: 1949 (age 76–77)
- Genres: Pop; rock; novelty music; new age; television score
- Labels: Stiff; Bark; K-Tel; Higher Octave
- Formerly of: The Firm

John O'Connor (born 1949) is a British guitarist, songwriter, and composer. He lives in Santa Barbara, California.

== Bark Studio ==
O'Connor studied guitar at the London College of Music. He formed Bark recording studio in the 1980s in Walthamstow, North London. He produced, engineered and played guitar on hundreds of records for singers, bands, TV and radio commercials. He moved to California later that decade. He transitioned from writing music to playing music in the 1990s. He played in bands and toured with singers including Maddy Prior, Rick Kemp, Isla St Clair and Bucks Fizz.

== The Firm ==
In 1982, he and songwriting partner Graham Lister wrote and recorded "Arthur Daley He's Alright". The song was released under the name The Firm by Stiff Records and reached the Top Ten in the UK charts.

In 1987, along with co-writers Graham Lister and Rory Kehoe, O'Connor wrote and recorded "Star Trekkin'". The single spent a fortnight at number one on the UK Singles Chart, and became the tenth best-selling single of 1987 in the UK, selling more than a million copies worldwide.

All singles and more songs were later released on an album called Serious Fun released by K-Tel.

=== Eko ===
O'Connor moved to California in the late 1980s, where he began writing and recording instrumental new age/world music under the pseudonym Eko. He made five CDs for Higher Octave Music, the first of which was Future Primitive (1989) which reached the Billboard Top Ten New Age Albums. The other albums he wrote were Logikal (1992), Alter Eko (1994), and Celtica (1996). Future Primitive sold about 75,000 copies while the other albums were less popular and sold about 30,000 copies. After completing the final CD in 1996, he appears to have stopped using the pseudonym.

=== King of the Hill ===
In 1997, 20th Century Fox and Judgmental Films invited him to create the music for the first episode of a new animated television series, King of the Hill, for the Fox television network. He became one of three regular composers for the Emmy award-winning show. The show ran for 13 seasons, ending in 2010. It remains in syndication. In 1998, he won the BMI TV Music Award.
