= Possible Theme for a Future TV Drama Series =

Single by Mental As Anything

from the album Get Wet
- B-side: "Typical Romance"
- Released: November 1979
- Genre: Rock
- Length: 2:16
- Label: Regular Records
- Songwriter(s): Martin Plaza
- Producer(s): Cameron Allan

Mental As Anything singles chronology
"The Nips Are Getting Bigger" (1979)	"Possible Theme for a Future TV Drama Series" (1979)	"Egypt" (1980)

"Possible Theme for a Future TV Drama Series" is a song by Australian band Mental As Anything, released in November 1979 as the second single from the album Get Wet and the song reached at number 57 on the Kent Music Report. The song was written by Mental As Anything lead vocalist Martin Plaza.

== Track listing ==
Regular (K7678)
No.	Title	Writer(s)	Length
1.	"Possible Theme for a Future TV Drama Series"	Martin Plaza	2:16
2.	"Typical Romance"	Reg Mombassa	2:28

== Personnel ==
- Martin Plaza — lead vocals, guitar
- Greedy Smith — lead vocals, keyboards, harmonica
- Reg Mombassa — guitar, vocals
- Peter O'Doherty — bass, guitar, vocals
- Wayne de Lisle – drums

== Charts ==
Chart (1979/80)	Peak position
Australian (Kent Music Report)	57
