= I.R.S. Records =

American record label

- Parent company: Universal Music Group
- Founded: 1979 (original); 2012 (relaunch)
- Founder: Miles Copeland III; Jay Boberg
- Defunct: May 1996 (original); 2015 (relaunch)
- Status: Ceased operations
- Distributors: A&M (1979–1985); MCA (1985–1990); EMI (1990–1996); EMI (2011–2012); Caroline Distribution (2013–2015); Capitol Music Group/UMe (2015–present)
- Genre: Rock; new wave
- Country of origin: United States
- Official website: onamrecords.com

I.R.S. Records is a former independent record label founded by Miles Copeland III and Jay Boberg in 1979. I.R.S. produced some of the most popular bands of the 1980s, and was particularly known for issuing records by college rock, new wave and alternative rock artists, including R.E.M., the Go-Go's, Wall of Voodoo, and Fine Young Cannibals. Currently the label is distributed by parent company Universal Music Group.

== History ==
Miles Copeland III, the son of CIA officer Miles Copeland Jr., played many roles in the U.K. punk rock and new wave music industry of the middle to late 1970s: agent, manager, producer, magazine publisher, record company and label owner. His brother Ian was the head of a talent agency, Frontier Booking International (F.B.I.), while his brother Stewart played drums for The Police, a band that Copeland managed. The Police's first album was released on A&M Records in 1978 with a hit single, "Roxanne", that Copeland called a turning point in his life.

Building on success with the Police, Copeland convinced Jerry Moss, co-owner of A&M, to establish the I.R.S. division in 1979. I.R.S. stood for International Record Syndicate.

From 1983 to 1987, I.R.S. Records sponsored a monthly MTV show called I.R.S. Records Presents The Cutting Edge, hosted by Peter Zaremba of The Fleshtones. The series concentrated on bands that recorded for the label. The show concept would later evolve into the alternative rock program 120 Minutes, which was launched in 1986 and co-existed with Cutting Edge for about a year and a half.

I.R.S. releases were distributed by A&M until 1985, then by MCA Records until 1990, and by EMI until the label folded in 1996. In 1985, Copeland brokered a deal to switch the label's distributor to MCA Records. Under the agreement, A&M continued to release the label's pre-1985 catalog, much of which still can be found under the A&M banner. Copeland sold the I.R.S. music publishing to Rondor Music in 1995.

The label folded in May 1996, with its last release being All Set by Buzzcocks, issued two weeks before the closure. Shortly after, Copeland formed Ark 21 Records.

In 2011, EMI revived the label; as of 2012, the new label had Chiddy Bang and Foxy Shazam on its roster. In October 2013, shortly after the integration of EMI into its successor, Universal Music Group, the label was revived again as I.R.S. Nashville, with Striking Matches, Marc Scibilia and Cowboy Jack Clement on its roster before being shut down once again in 2015.

== Faulty Products labels ==
Faulty Products was the UK holding company for I.R.S. Records of the UK record labels set up by Copeland. It included Illegal Records, Deptford Fun City Records and others. Faulty Products was also an American independent record label and distribution company for other indie labels between 1980 and 1982. Faulty handled artists (such as The Bangles) that did not go through I.R.S.'s distribution deal with A&M.

Illegal Records was set up by Miles Copeland with his younger brother Stewart and the manager of The Police, Paul Mulligan. The label released The Police's debut single, "Fall Out". Deptford Fun City Records was set up by Miles Copeland in the late 1970s as an outlet for Deptford, England bands such as Alternative TV and Squeeze.

I.R.S. No Speak, also known as No Speak Records, was set up as an all-instrumental imprint of I.R.S. in January 1988. It released albums by Stewart Copeland, Wishbone Ash, and William Orbit.

Tribal America was a label run by Rob DiStefano that was distributed by I.R.S. from 1991 until IRS folded in 1996. It concentrated on house music, a type of electronic dance music. The most prominent releases on its roster were by the production team Murk and also the song "So Get Up" an iconic vocal poem by Californian author/songwriter Ithaka Darin Pappas, backed by the Progressive house sounds of USL from Lisbon, Portugal. DiStefano went on to found Twisted America Records.

== Roster ==
I.R.S.'s roster of musicians included:

- The Alarm
- Bangles
- Berlin
- Black Sabbath
- Buzzcocks
- John Cale
- Candi & The Backbeat
- Candyman
- Belinda Carlisle
- Caterwaul
- Chrome Molly
- Concrete Blonde
- Stewart Copeland
- The Cramps
- Dada
- The Damned
- Dead Kennedys
- The English Beat
- The Fall
- Fine Young Cannibals
- The Fleshtones
- General Public
- The Genitorturers
- Gren
- The Go-Go's
- hHead
- Henry Badowski
- Humans
- Jools Holland
- Leslie Spit Treeo
- Klark Kent
- Let's Active
- The Lords of the New Church
- Magazine
- Marillion
- Gary Numan
- Nuclear Assault
- Oingo Boingo
- Over the Rhine
- R.E.M.
- Renaissance
- Scott Merritt
- Sea Stories
- Seduce
- Shampoo
- Stan Ridgway
- Skafish
- The Stranglers
- Sahotas
- Timbuk 3
- Torch Song
- Twinset and the Pearl
- Wall of Voodoo
- William Orbit
- YEN

== Sales certifications ==
I.R.S. Records released three albums that have been certified as platinum or multi-platinum, for sales of over 1 million units, by the Recording Industry Association of America: Beauty and the Beat by The Go-Go's (1981), Document by R.E.M. (1987) and The Raw & the Cooked by Fine Young Cannibals (1989). Seven additional albums have also been certified gold for sales of at least 500,000 copies: Murmur (1983), Reckoning (1984), Fables of the Reconstruction (1985) and Lifes Rich Pageant (1986), all by R.E.M., Vacation by The Go-Go's (1982), Belinda by Belinda Carlisle (1986) and Bloodletting by Concrete Blonde (1990).

== I.R.S. compilation albums ==
On the Charts was a 1994 compilation album that chronicled I.R.S. Records from 1979 to 1994.

=== US version ===
1. "Our Lips Are Sealed" – The Go-Go's
2. "Mexican Radio" [Edit] – Wall of Voodoo
3. "Only a Lad" – Oingo Boingo
4. "The Future's So Bright, I Gotta Wear Shades" – Timbuk3
5. "Save It for Later" – The English Beat
6. "She Drives Me Crazy" – Fine Young Cannibals
7. "Mad About You" [Single Mix] – Belinda Carlisle
8. "Tenderness" – General Public
9. "The One I Love" – R.E.M.
10. "Joey" – Concrete Blonde
11. "Rain in the Summertime" [Edit] – The Alarm
12. "Dizz Knee Land" – Dada

=== UK version ===
1. "Our Lips Are Sealed" – The Go-Go's
2. "Mexican Radio" [Edit] – Wall of Voodoo
3. "68 Guns" – The Alarm
4. "The Future's So Bright, I Gotta Wear Shades" – Timbuk3
5. "Spirit in the Sky" – Doctor and the Medics
6. "Heartbreaker (At the End of Lonely Street)" – Dread Zeppelin
7. "Camouflage" – Stan Ridgway
8. "Mad About You" [Single Mix] – Belinda Carlisle
9. "Hey Matthew" – Karel Fialka
10. "The One I Love" – R.E.M.
11. "Joey" – Concrete Blonde
12. "Holy Cow" – Jools Holland
13. "Dizz Knee Land" – Dada
