= Getahead =

Studio album by Curiosity Killed the Cat
- Released: 23 October 1989
- Studio: The Manor; Matrix; Ridge Farm; Chipping Norton; RAK; Maison Rouge; Olympic; Larrabee Sound; various others
- Genre: Pop; funk
- Length: 48:42
- Label: Mercury
- Producer: Nathan East (2–4, 6, 7, 9, 10); Allen Toussaint (5, 8); Glenn Skinner (1, 11); Curiosity Killed the Cat (12)

Curiosity Killed the Cat chronology
Keep Your Distance (1987)	Getahead (1989)	Back to Front (1992)

Singles from Getahead
- 1. "Name and Number" Released: September 1989; 2. "First Place" Released: November 1989

Professional ratings
Review scores
Source	Rating
AllMusic	4/5 stars
Hi-Fi News & Record Review	A*:1
Number One	3/5 stars
Record Mirror	2/5 stars

Getahead is the second studio album by the British pop band, Curiosity Killed the Cat. The album reached number 29 in the UK, and contained the hit single "Name and Number".

== Track listing ==
All tracks are written by Curiosity Killed the Cat and Michael J McEvoy, except where indicated

No.	Title	Writer(s)	Length
1.	"Name and Number"	Curiosity, Glenn Skinner, Michael J McEvoy	4:01
2.	"Do Your Believin'"		4:15
3.	"Cascade"		3:57
4.	"First Place"		4:34
5.	"We Just Gotta Do It (For Us)"		4:15
6.	"Go Go Ahead"		2:24
7.	"Trees Don't Grow on Money"		4:08
8.	"Treat You So Well"		4:15
9.	"Who Are You"		3:49
10.	"Security Lady"		4:10
11.	"Something New, Something Blue"		3:56
12.	"Keep On Trying"		4:58
Total length:			48:42

== Charts ==
=== Weekly charts ===
Chart (1989–90)	Peak position
Australia (ARIA)	136
Dutch Albums (Album Top 100)	90
UK Albums (OCC)	29

=== Singles ===
Chart (1989)	Single title	Peak position
UK Singles	"Name and Number"	14
Ireland	"Name and Number"	16
Italy	"Name and Number"	13
UK Singles	"First Place"	86

== Certifications ==
Certifications for Getahead
Region	Certification	Certified units/sales
United Kingdom (BPI)	Silver	60,000^{^}
^{^} Shipments figures based on certification alone.
