= He's Just No Good for You =

Single by Mental As Anything

from the album Mouth to Mouth
- B-side: "Ruby Baby"
- Released: July 1987
- Studio: Rhinoceros Studios
- Genre: Rock
- Length: 3:28; 4:06 (Extended mix)
- Label: CBS Records; Epic Records
- Songwriter(s): Greedy Smith
- Producer(s): Richard Gottehrer

Mental As Anything singles chronology
"Let's Go to Paradise" (1986)	"He's Just No Good for You" (1987)	"Don't Tell Me Now" (1987)

Music video
- "He's Just No Good For You" on YouTube

"He's Just No Good for You" is a song by Australian pop rock band Mental As Anything, released in July 1987. It was released as the second single from the band's sixth studio album, Mouth to Mouth. The song was written by Mental As Anything guitarist Greedy Smith and peaked at number 15 on the Australian charts.

== Video ==
A promotional video was released of the band miming the song as they walked along Scarborough St in Monterey, New South Wales. Jane Gazzo described it as "brilliant and memorable. Walking along the footpath, passing iconic brick and fibro houses from the 40s, 50s and 60s, while Greedy, resplendent in a distinctive brown, smartly fitted suit, sings with gusto."

Smith later noted, "Denis Handlin, the then CEO of Sony, said, 'It will never be a hit because of Greedy's brown suit.'" Smith said he, "came up with the idea watching David Lynch's Blue Velvet. I saw the opening of the film and wanted to do something similar with Australian houses."

== Track listings ==
CBS (650913 7)
No.	Title	Writer(s)	Length
1.	"He's Just No Good For You"	Greedy Smith	3:28
2.	"Ruby Baby"	Martin Plaza	4:38

12" version
No.	Title	Writer(s)	Length
1.	"He's Just No Good For You (Extended Mix)"	Greedy Smith	4:06
2.	"Live It Up (Extended Mix)"	Greedy Smith	6:06
3.	"Ruby Baby"	Martin Plaza	4:38

== Personnel ==
- Martin Plaza – lead vocals, guitar
- Wayne de Lisle – drums
- Reg Mombassa – guitar, vocals
- Greedy Smith – lead vocals, keyboards, harmonica
- Peter O'Doherty – bass guitar, vocals

== Charts ==
=== Weekly charts ===
Chart (1987)	Peak position
Australia (Australian Music Report)	15
UK (OCC)	88

=== Year-end charts ===
Chart (1987)	Position
Australia (Australian Music Report)	91
