= Mouth to Mouth (Mental As Anything album) =

Studio album by Mental As Anything
- Released: 31 July 1987
- Recorded: 1986
- Studio: Rhinoceros Studios, Sydney, Australia
- Genre: Pop, rock
- Length: 42:44
- Label: Epic
- Producer: Richard Gottehrer

Mental As Anything chronology
Greatest Hits Vol. 1 (1986)	Mouth to Mouth (1987)	Cyclone Raymond (1989)

Singles from Mouth To Mouth
- 1. "Let's Go to Paradise" Released: November 1986; 2. "He's Just No Good for You" Released: July 1987; 3. "Don't Tell Me Now" Released: September 1987

Professional ratings
Review scores
Source	Rating
AllMusic	4/5 stars

Mouth to Mouth is the sixth studio album by Australian pop rock band Mental As Anything, released in July 1987, and the album was produced by Richard Gottehrer. The album peaked at number 14 on the Australian chart.

== Recording ==
Bassist O'Doherty said, "Gottehrer programmed all the drums and virtually all of the bass. So there was virtually no point in me and [drummer] Bird being there. I remember feeling pretty desolate, thinking 'I fucking hate this'. It wasn't fun anymore. I was programmed out, basically."

== Reception ==
Jane Gazzo said the album, "epitomised 80s keyboard experimentation. With spacy, ethereal synthesiser treatments and expansive gated drum sounds." She also noted of the title track "some felt marked the band's departure into overindulgence".

Trouser Press said, "There isn't an unlikable moment anywhere on the record, but the Mentals seem in danger of drifting into musical senility unless they find some collective personality and start showing a little more enthusiasm."

== Track listing ==
Australian release:

No.	Title	Writer(s)	Length
1.	"Don't Tell Me Now"	Martin Plaza	4:02
2.	"My Door Is Always Open to You"	Greedy Smith	4:01
3.	"Put Me Back"	Martin Plaza	4:31
4.	"Let's Go to Paradise"	Greedy Smith	3:19
5.	"The Mad King"	Peter O'Doherty	5:16
6.	"He's Just No Good for You"	Greedy Smith	3:26
7.	"Thinking Out Loud"	Martin Plaza	3:48
8.	"Stay at Home Girl"	Reg Mombassa	3:19
9.	"Mouth to Mouth"	Greedy Smith	3:48
10.	"I'm Glad"	Peter O'Doherty	3:19
11.	"Ruby Baby"	Martin Plaza	4:38
12.	"Wandering Through Heaven"	Reg Mombassa	4:01

International releases:
The US/Canada version of the album drops "Ruby Baby", and adds the band's cover of "Love Me Tender". Releases in the UK and continental Europe also drop "Ruby Baby", and add "Love Me Tender" and a new version of "If You Leave Me, Can I Come Too?", which is remixed and overdubbed with some new vocals and instrumentation. Production of both these international tracks was by Mark Opitz.

== Personnel ==
=== Musicians ===
- Martin Plaza — lead vocals, guitar
- Greedy Smith — lead vocals, keyboards, harmonica
- Reg Mombassa — guitar, vocals
- Peter O'Doherty — bass, guitar, vocals
- Wayne de Lisle — drums

=== Additional personnel ===
- Martin Armiger — guitar
- Mary Bradfield-Taylor — vocals
- Rick Chadwick — keyboards
- Sandi Chick — vocals
- Andrew Farriss — keyboards
- Mark Kennedy — percussion

=== Recording details ===
- Producer — Richard Gottehrer
- Engineer, mixing — Thom Panunzio
- Assistant — Allan Wright

=== Art work ===
- Art direction — Jana Hartig, Ken Smith, Sue Woollard
- Design — Martin Plaza, Greedy Smith (and cover design)
- Photography — Paula Clarke (cover photo), Paul Clarke, Hugh Hamilton, Frank Lindner (and sleeve photo), Francine McDougall

== Charts ==
Chart (1987)	Peak position
Australian (Kent Music Report)	14

== Release history ==
Region	Date	Label	Format	Catalogue
Australia	27 July 1987	CBS Records	LP, Cassette	450361 1 450361 4
Australia	21 September 1987	CBS Records	CD	CDCBS 450361 2
United States	1987	Columbia	Cassette	BFC 40299
Netherlands	1987	Epic	CD	EPC 460049 2
UK	1987	Epic	LP, Vinyl	460049 1
