= Apocalypso (Wiping the Smile Off Santa's Face) =

Single by Mental As Anything
- B-side: "Wouldn't Try to Explain"
- Released: November 1984
- Genre: Rock
- Length: 3:30; 6:55 (Extended version)
- Label: Regular Records, CBS Records, WEA Records
- Songwriters: Martin Plaza, Reg Mombassa
- Producer: Mark Opitz

Mental As Anything singles chronology
| "Working for the Man" (1983) | "Apocalypso (Wiping the Smile Off Santa's Face)" (1984) | "You're So Strong" (1985) |

Music video
- "Apocalypso (Wiping The Smile Off Santa's Face)" on YouTube

"Apocalypso (Wiping the Smile Off Santa's Face)" is a Christmas song by Australian band Mental As Anything, released in November 1984. The song reached at number 37 on the Kent Music Report.

== Overview ==
The song was originally conceived as a slow walking blues, and according the composer Reg Mombassa it initially had "a Jimmy Reed sort of feel"; after listening to it, Martin Plaza felt that the melody work better in a ZZ Top style and rearranged it accordingly.

The band recorded the song in Rhinoceros Studios, Sydney. The New Zealand-Australian singer Jenny Morris provided the female vocals.

== Track listing ==
Regular Records (RRSP 743)
| No. | Title | Writer(s) | Length |
|---|---|---|---|
| 1. | "Apocalypso (Wiping the Smile Off Santa's Face)" | Martin Plaza, Reg Mombassa | 3:30 |
| 2. | "Wouldn't Try to Explain" | Martin Plaza, Reg Mombassa | 3:15 |

12" version
| No. | Title | Writer(s) | Length |
|---|---|---|---|
| 1. | "Apocalypso (Wiping the Smile Off Santa's Face) (Extended Mix)" | Martin Plaza, Reg Mombassa | 6:55 |
| 2. | "Apocalypso (Wiping the Smile Off Santa's Face)" | Martin Plaza, Reg Mombassa | 3:49 |
| 3. | "Wouldn't Try to Explain" | Martin Plaza, Reg Mombassa | 3:15 |

== Personnel ==
- Martin Plaza – lead vocals, guitar
- Wayne de Lisle – drums
- Reg Mombassa – guitar, vocals
- Greedy Smith – lead vocals, keyboards, harmonica
- Peter O'Doherty – bass guitar, vocals

== Charts ==
| Chart (1984/85) | Peak position |
|---|---|
| Australian (Kent Music Report) | 37 |
