= Misfit (Curiosity Killed the Cat song) =

1986 single by Curiosity Killed the Cat

- 1987 reissue vinyl cover

Single by Curiosity Killed the Cat

from the album Keep Your Distance
- B-side: "Man"
- Released: 8 August 1986; 8 June 1987 (reissue)
- Genre: Sophisti-pop
- Length: 4:02; 7:02 (12")
- Label: Mercury
- Songwriters: Curiosity Killed the Cat; Toby Andersen
- Producer: Stewart Levine

Curiosity Killed the Cat singles chronology
"Misfit" (1986)	"Down to Earth" (1986)

"Misfit" is the debut single by English band Curiosity Killed the Cat, originally released in August 1986. The song was not particularly successful and only reached number 76 on the UK Singles Chart. However, the following year, after the success of "Down to Earth" and "Ordinary Day", "Misfit" was re-released in June 1987, upon which it was much more successful, peaking at number 7 in the UK.

== Music video ==
The music video was directed by Andy Warhol and also features a cameo appearance by him. It was also one of his last assignments before his death the following year. The band met Warhol at an exhibition in Mayfair and he took a shine to bass player Nick Thorp. He then invited the band to a banquet he was having later at the Café Royal and said he was interested in hearing some of their music. After listening to "Misfit", Warhol said he'd 'love to do a video for you boys' after Phonogram had said they weren't going to make a video for it. The video was then shot in New York in a week.

== Track listings ==
7": Mercury / MER 226 (UK, 1986) / CAT 4 (UK, 1987)

1. "Misfit" – 4:02
2. "Man" – 3:49

12": Mercury / MERX 226 (UK, 1986)

1. "Misfit" (Extended Mix) – 7:02
2. "Man" – 3:49
3. "Corruption" (Dub) – 5:26

12": Mercury / MERXR 226 (UK, 1986)

1. "Misfit" (Scratch Mix)
2. "Misfit" (Dub Mix)
3. "Misfit" (John Morales Extended Mix)

12"/Cassette: Mercury / CATX 4 / CATXM 4 (UK, 1987)

1. "Misfit" (Extended Mix)
2. "Man"
3. "Misfit" (7" Version)

CDV: Mercury / 080 112-2 (UK, 1987)

1. "Misfit" (12" Version) – 7:01
2. Red Lights – 5:32
3. Shallow Memory – 4:29
4. "Misfit" (Video) – 4:04

== Charts ==
Chart (1986)	Peak position
UK Singles (OCC)	76

Chart (1987)	Peak position
Australia (Kent Music Report)	97
Germany (GfK)	53
Ireland (IRMA)	8
Italy (Musica e dischi)	16
Netherlands (Dutch Top 40)	35
Netherlands (Single Top 100)	48
UK Singles (OCC)	7
US Billboard Hot 100	42
US Hot Dance Club Play (Billboard)	39
