= Get Wet (Mental As Anything album) =

Studio album by Mental As Anything
- Released: November 1979
- Recorded: United Sound, Sydney, Australia
- Genre: Pop
- Length: 36:46
- Label: Regular; Virgin
- Producer: Cameron Allan

Mental As Anything chronology
Get Wet (1979)	Espresso Bongo (1980)

Singles from Get Wet
- 1. "The Nips Are Getting Bigger" Released: July 1979; 2. "Possible Theme for a Future TV Drama Series" Released: November 1979; 3. "Egypt" Released: January 1980

Professional ratings
Review scores
Source	Rating
Smash Hits	6/10
AllMusic	4/5 stars
Record Mirror	4.5/5 stars
Sputnikmusic	2.5/5 stars

Get Wet is the debut studio album released by Australian band Mental As Anything. It was released in November 1979, and peaked at No. 19 on the Australian Album charts.

Mombassa said the band's goal was, "Getting an album out that was reasonably like us. We had no great plans of what it should sound like although that was probably a bad idea as it should've sounded better. But it was done hastily and it's not a bad album."

== Reception ==
Trouser Press said the album "is certainly a good-natured introduction to a band unafraid to write a love song to a foreign country based on travel ads ("Egypt") or pitch a cheesy instrumental bit with Sam the Sham organ as a "Possible Theme for a Future TV Drama Series"."

== Track listing ==
Side A

1. "The Nips Are Getting Bigger" (Written: Plaza, Vocal: Plaza)
2. "Spanish Gardener" (Written: Plaza, Vocal: Plaza)
3. "Business and Pleasure" (Written: Reg Mombassa, Vocals: Mombassa)
4. "Sheilah" (Written: Plaza, Vocal: Plaza)
5. "Possible Theme for a Future TV Drama Series" (Written: Plaza, Vocal: Plaza)
6. "Talk to Baby Jesus" (Written: Mombassa, Vocals: Mombassa)
7. "Egypt" (Written: Mombassa, Vocals: Mombassa/Plaza)

Side B

1. "Another Man's Sitting in My Kitchen" (Written: Greedy Smith, Vocal: Smith)
2. "Can I Come Home?" (Written: Mombassa, Vocal: Mombassa)
3. "Fringe Benefits" (Written: Plaza, Vocal: Plaza)
4. "Insurance Man" (Written: Smith, Vocal: Smith)
5. "Empty Hearts/Open Wounds" (Written: Mombassa, Vocal: Mombassa)
6. "Love Is Not a Gift" (titled "Pork Is Not a Gift" on some versions) (Written: Peter O'Doherty, Vocal: O'Doherty)
7. "Wolf at Your Door" (Written: O'Doherty, Vocal: Plaza)

== Personnel ==
=== Musicians ===
- Martin Plaza — lead vocals, guitar
- Greedy Smith — lead vocals, keyboards, harmonica
- Reg Mombassa — guitar, vocals
- Peter O'Doherty — bass, guitar, vocals
- Wayne de Lisle — drums

=== Recording details ===
- Cameron Allan — producer
- Heather Dalton — engineer
- Spencer Lee — engineer
- Ted Jensen at Sterling Sound, NYC — mastering

== Charts ==
Chart (1979/80)	Peak position
Australian (Kent Music Report)	19

== Certifications and sales ==
Region	Certification	Certified units/sales
Australia (ARIA)	Platinum	50,000^{^}
^{^} Shipments figures based on certification alone.

== Release history ==
Region	Date	Label	Format	Catalogue
Australia / New Zealand	November 1979	Regular Records	LP, Cassette	L 37125 / C 37125
Europe	1980	Virgin Records	LP, Cassette	2473802
Australia	1992	Regular Records	CD	D19560
