= Hey Matthew =

Single by Karel Fialka

from the album Human Animal
- B-side: "The Things I Saw"
- Released: August 1987
- Studio: The Old Barn (Croydon)
- Genre: Synth-pop
- Length: 3:25
- Label: I.R.S.
- Songwriter: Karel Fialka
- Producers: Karel Fialka; Nick Magnus

Karel Fialka singles chronology
"Eat, Drink, Dance, Relax" (1984)	"Hey Matthew" (1987)	"You Be the Judge" (1988)

Music video
- "Hey Matthew" on YouTube

"Hey Matthew" is a song by the British synth-pop musician Karel Fialka, released as a single in August 1987 by I.R.S. Records. It was later included on his second studio album, Human Animal (1988).

The song has minimal instrumentation with only synthesizers and a drum machine being used. The song consists of Fialka questioning his stepson about what he sees on television, to which Matthew responds "Dallas, Dynasty, Terrahawks, He-Man, Tom and Jerry, Dukes of Hazzard, Airwolf, Blue Thunder, Rambo, Road Runner, Daffy Duck and The A-Team"; and what he wants to be as a profession when he grows up: "soldier, street fighter, a police man, a captain of a boat (... big boat), magic man, a cowboy, train driver, high jump champion, a fireman, a pilot, I want to be your friend".

The music video follows the plot of the song, with the camera making it appear that the viewer is looking in on the family through the television.

The song was Fialka's biggest chart hit, peaking at number 9 on the UK singles chart and spending eight weeks in the listings. It also reached number 15 in Germany and number 29 on the US Modern Rock Tracks chart.

In 1997, both Karel and Matthew appeared on the comedy panel game show Never Mind the Buzzcocks in the Identity Parade line-up. Both were identified successfully.

== Background and recording ==
Fialka published his recollection of the background of the song's history:

"I wrote Hey Matthew on a toy Yamaha keyboard but needed better sounds and also a way of recording those instrumental parts and vocals…I met Nick Magnus at a friends birthday party and he, as well as being an exceptionally nice guy and a superb musician, had some mouth-watering music gear including great rackmounts and a Fostex R8 [8-track recorder], …and a Roland mc500 sequencer…the first I'd seen.

Nick put in the great bass line and always gets big thanks for the time, energy and expertise he gave me on this track and on other later projects.

I was stony broke at this time and working as a gardener near Newbury to keep my family fed and housed but I was convinced of the commercial potential of the song and so I used the first lump sum of money I received to pay for a cheap 24 track studio which had been recommended to me. This was The Old Barn Studios in Croydon which was owned and run by Matthew Fisher who had played keyboards in Procol Harum."

== Charts ==
Chart (1987–1989)	Peak position
Iceland (Íslenski listinn)	7
Ireland (IRMA)	7
Israel (IBA)	4
Switzerland (Schweizer Hitparade)	13
UK Singles (OCC)	9
US Modern Rock Tracks (Billboard)	29
West Germany (GfK)	15
