= Karel Fialka =

British singer-songwriter (born 1946)

- Born: Karel Francis Fialka; 9 November 1946 (age 80); Calcutta, British India
- Genres: Synth-pop; new wave; pop rock
- Occupations: Singer; songwriter; musician; composer; record producer
- Instruments: Keyboards; vocals
- Years active: 1980–present
- Labels: I.R.S.; Blueprint
- Website: karelfialka.com

Karel Francis Fialka (born 9 November 1946) is a British singer, songwriter, musician and record producer. He is best known for his 1987 single, "Hey Matthew".

== Early life ==
Karel Francis Fialka was born on 9 November 1946 in Calcutta, British India, to a Scottish mother and Czech father. His father, Karel Fialka Sr. (1916–1963), was a pilot of No. 311 (Czechoslovak) Squadron RAF, who met his future wife in Tain, Scotland, in 1944. They married in summer of 1945 and later moved to India because of Karel Sr.'s job for Baťa Company.

== Career ==
Fialka was launched in 1980 as "the street poet of the 1980s." Fialka's debut studio album Still Life was well received. The single "The Eyes Have It" received radio play.

Fialka had a top 10 hit in 1987 on the UK singles chart with the single "Hey Matthew", (on I.R.S. Records). Fialka works mainly as a conceptual songwriter and record producer with occasional and infrequent live appearances.

"The Things I Saw" was released on the Berlin based Studio !K7 label, as part of Booka Shade's DJ mix album DJ-Kicks: Booka Shade in October 2007. This came as a mashup with another track by Akiko Kiyama.

Fialka released his third studio album Film Noir in March 2009. Featured guest artists included Tilda Swinton and Paul Roberts (Sniff 'n' the Tears).

Bootleg recordings include the titles Morrison Cafe, a deconstruction of songs by the Doors, and To Live Outside the Law You Must Be Honest, where he has done the same to songs written by Bob Dylan.

== Songwriting and production credits ==
Fialka has written songs recorded and/or remixed by other artists, as follows:

- "Maybe Someday" – Cliff Richard – Dressed for the Occasion (1983)
- "In the Silence of the Night" – Sniff 'n' the Tears – Underground (2001)
- "Lip Service" – Sniff 'n' the Tears – Underground (2001)
- "The Misidia Monarchy/The Things I Saw" – Booka Shade – DJ-Kicks: Booka Shade (2007)
- "Thru the Gate... Every Step of the Way" – Martin Stephenson – Collective Force (2002)
- "Today Is Yesterday" – Simeone – An Introduction to Simeone (2011)

== Discography ==
=== Studio albums ===
- Still Life (1980)
- Human Animal (1988)
- Film Noir (2009)

=== Singles ===
Year	Title	Chart positions			
Year	Title	UK	SWI	GER	US Alt.
1980	"The Eyes Have It"	52	—	—	—
1980	"File in Forget"	—	—	—	—
1980	"Armband"	—	—	—	—
1984	"Eat, Drink, Dance, Relax"	—	—	—	—
1987	"Hey Matthew"	9	13	15	29
1988	"Eat, Drink, Dance, Relax" (remix)	—	—	—	—
1988	"You Be the Judge"	—	—	—	—
"—" denotes releases that did not chart or were not released in that territory.

== See also ==
- List of performers on Top of the Pops
