= Down to Earth (Curiosity Killed the Cat song) =

1986 single by Curiosity Killed the Cat

Single by Curiosity Killed the Cat

from the album Keep Your Distance
- B-side: "Down to Earth" (Instrumental)
- Released: 7 November 1986
- Genre: Sophisti-pop
- Length: 3:48 (7"); 6:00 (12"); 4:19 (album version)
- Label: Mercury
- Songwriters: Curiosity Killed the Cat; Toby Andersen
- Producer: Stewart Levine

Curiosity Killed the Cat singles chronology
"Misfit" (1986)	"Down to Earth" (1986)	"Ordinary Day" (1987)

"Down to Earth" is a song by English band Curiosity Killed the Cat, released in November 1986 by Mercury Records as the second single from their debut album Keep Your Distance. It was the band's biggest hit, peaking at number 3 on the UK Singles Chart.

After the lack of success with "Misfit" when it was first released 4 months earlier, the record company wanted to release another single. However, the record company wanted to release it after the Christmas period as they believed the song wouldn't survive the Christmas rush. Curiosity insisted on releasing "Down to Earth" before and so it was released in November and it slowly moved up the charts until it spent three weeks at number 3 in February 1987.

== Track listings ==
7": Mercury / CAT 2 (UK)

1. "Down to Earth" – 3:48
2. "Down to Earth" (Instrumental) – 3:48

12": Mercury / CATX 2 (UK)

1. "Down to Earth" (Extended Mix) – 6:00
2. "Shallow Memory" – 4:28
3. "Down to Earth" (Instrumental) – 3:48

Double 12": Mercury / CATXD 2 (UK)

1. "Down to Earth" (Extended Mix)
2. "Shallow Memory"
3. "Down to Earth" (Instrumental)
4. "Misfit" (John Morales Extended Mix)

CDV: Mercury / 080 100-2 (UK; released in 1987)

1. "Down to Earth" (Extended Mix)
2. "Mile High"
3. "Know What You Know"
4. "Down to Earth" (Video)

== Charts ==
=== Weekly charts ===
Chart (1987)	Peak position
Australia (Kent Music Report)	88
Belgium (Ultratop 50 Flanders)	24
Germany (GfK)	32
Ireland (IRMA)	5
Netherlands (Dutch Top 40)	12
Netherlands (Single Top 100)	14
New Zealand (Recorded Music NZ)	13
UK Singles (Official Charts)	3

=== Year-end charts ===
Chart (1987)	Position
European Top 100 Singles (Music & Media)	100
UK Singles (Official Charts Company)	22
