= Star Trekkin' =

1987 single by the Firm

"Star Trekkin' "
- UK single release

Single by the Firm

from the album Serious Fun
- Released: 26 May 1987
- Genre: Novelty
- Length: 3:32
- Label: Bark
- Songwriters: John O'Connor, Grahame Lister, Rory Kehoe
- Producers: Grahame Lister, John O'Connor

The Firm singles chronology
"Long Live the National" (1983)	"Star Trekkin' " (1987)	"Superheroes" (1987)

"Star Trekkin'" is a song by British novelty band the Firm. It parodies the original Star Trek TV series and prominently features comical voice caricatures of the Trek characters, provided by members of the band, a studio technician, and the wife of one of the songwriters. One of the song's phrases, "It's life, Jim, but not as we know it", actually originated with "Star Trekkin'" but has been subsequently misattributed to the TV series.

"Star Trekkin'" was released as a single in May 1987. The song's promotional video was created by a team of art students called "The Film Garage", featuring a combination of puppetry, stop-motion animation and computer-generated imagery. The song entered the UK Singles Chart at number 74 and eventually climbed to number one, spending two weeks there. It also found chart success in a number of other countries, selling more than a million copies.

== Origin and recording ==
"Star Trekkin'" originated from songwriter Rory Kehoe, who was a member of an English Civil War combat reenactment society called The Sealed Knot. Kehoe had written a series of verses about the principal characters who appear in the 1960s American science-fiction television series Star Trek, which were sung in pubs and around campfires, after Sealed Knot battles, to the tune of "The Music Man". This version was re-titled "I Am the Star Trek Man". Chris Steinhauer performed this version at a folk club one evening in 1986, which is where it was first heard by Grahame Lister, of novelty band the Firm. Lister convinced Steinhauer to record the song onto an audio cassette and took it to his writing partner John O'Connor.

The duo dropped "The Music Man" melody and wrote a new chorus. They at first attempted to set Kehoe's lyrics to the tune of their 1982 hit single "Arthur Daley E's Alright", creating an alternative version initially entitled "Captain Kirk (He's Alright)". Unsatisfied, they sought to create something original, locking themselves away for a week to write "Star Trekkin'", based on an increasing tempo seen previously in Rolf Harris' "The Court of King Caractacus". They sought to have it recorded professionally but were received unfavourably by potential recording labels. Instead, they recorded it at O'Connor's and Brian O'Shaughnessy's Bark Studios in Walthamstow, East London. The arrangement was by Bill C. Martin, and the rest of the Firm was made up of Dev Douglas and Peter Sills. O'Shaughnessy later said: "One of the greatest highlights of my career was producing 'Star Trekkin''. The record was produced to mock the series and we had no idea it was going to be a big hit."

The song features the catchphrases of several Star Trek characters, including Captain James T. Kirk, Spock and Doctor Leonard McCoy. These were intended to be recognisable to British listeners who had seen the episodes of the series on re-runs throughout the 1970s and 1980s, or those who were only relatively familiar with the source. While some of the lyrics bear a resemblance to real lines uttered on the show, e.g. Scotty's "Ye cannae change the laws of physics!" (originally "I can't change the laws of physics!" from "The Naked Time"), most are not accurate phrases from the series. Notably, Spock's "It's life, Jim, but not as we know it" never featured in The Original Series, but "Star Trekkin'" so popularised the phrase that it is now commonly misattributed. Kirk's "We come in peace; shoot to kill" also never featured and was suggested by author Brian Robb as having "summed up the popular impression of the trigger-happy captain's approach to alien encounters". One line was used later: "Scotty, beam me up", which is widely misquoted in popular culture as "Beam Me Up, Scotty". "Scotty, beam me up" appeared in 1986's Star Trek IV: The Voyage Home, though it is unknown whether the Firm were familiar enough with the movie to use the phrase in their 1987 "Star Trekkin'".

The voices of the characters were not provided by the actors who portrayed them in The Original Series; O'Connor voiced Kirk and McCoy, while Douglas voiced Spock. Scotty was voiced by a studio engineer and O'Connor's wife, Shelly, voiced Uhura.

== Release ==
At the time of its recording in 1987, Star Trek: The Next Generation had recently been announced and was in production, bringing new attention to the franchise. Having funded the pressing of 500 copies of the single, O'Connor sent copies of it to British radio stations, with the studio's phone number on them. One Liverpool station began giving the phone number out on air and O'Connor began to receive many phone calls from the area, asking for copies of the record. A Radio 1 disc jockey, Simon Bates, promoted the song and after an initial release where it reached 74th position on the UK Singles Chart, it climbed the following week to 13th place. For the two weeks afterwards, it was placed at number one, and becoming the ninth best-selling single of 1987 in the UK. At one point, it was selling 60,000 copies a day, and went on to sell more than 470,000 copies in the UK alone.

The single was also released outside of the UK, reaching 22nd place in the Ultratop chart within Belgium, 9th place in the neighbouring Dutch Top 40, and on the other side of the world, it reached third place on the ARIA Charts within Australia and peaked at number two on the Official New Zealand Music Chart. Worldwide, it sold more than a million copies. "Star Trekkin'" has become well known in the United States due to frequent play on the Dr. Demento Show radio program.

The Firm subsequently released an album, Serious Fun, in 1987, through K-Tel in the UK and Dino Music in Australia. "Star Trekkin'" was track one on the A-side of the record, and the album featured previous single "Arthur Daley E's Alright". The album also featured the follow-up single to "Star Trekkin'", "Superheroes", which was released in the UK on 26 September that year. It reached the 99th spot in the top 100, while the album did not chart.

== Music video ==
Following the success of the single, the band realised that they would be expected to appear on the British television series Top of the Pops on BBC1 the following week. The decision was made not to make personal television appearances, as O'Connor and Lister felt that they were a "bunch of balding thirty-somethings" and an appearance as themselves on the show "would kill the whole fun element of the thing stone dead". So, despite the time constraints, they sought for an animated music video to be created. They approached several potential providers, including the production company behind the television series Spitting Image, which had previously produced the video for the single "Land of Confusion" by Genesis. However, the cost was too high, and they needed longer than a week to create the video. One of the other companies approached was a team of graduate art students called "The Film Garage". On a low budget, they created a claymation stop motion animated video.

The characters in the video are based on food items, such as being made out of potatoes, with the Enterprise being created to look like it was made from pizza and sausages. The idea for the video as described by co-director Pete Bishop was that "Kirk has been out in space too long, and is hallucinating – about food". It was shot over seven days under the direction of Pete Bishop and Marc Kitchen-Smith, while the company No Strings was responsible for the model construction. The video was completed with just hours to spare before it was due to air for the first time on Top of the Pops.

== Reception ==
In Brian Robb's 2012 book, A Brief Guide to Star Trek, he said it was a testament to the quality of the series and of the characters that some 20 years after it was originally broadcast, a series of catchphrases could still summarise the appeal of the television series. The song has appeared in several lists, such as MSN's list of the most annoying songs of all time, where "Star Trekkin'" came in 15th place. British Sunday newspaper The People included it in a list of the most irritating songs in 2005, calling it "[f]unny, but dreadful". In 2011, it was included in Wired's list of seven great geek comedy songs.

== Track listings ==
7-inch single

A. "Star Trekkin'" – 3:25
B. "Dub Trek" – 2:25

12-inch single

A1. "Star Trekkin'" (extended version) – 6:01
B1. "Star Trekkin'" – 3:25
B2. "Dub Trek" – 2:25

== Charts ==
=== Weekly charts ===
Chart (1987)	Peak position
Australia (Australian Music Report)	3
Belgium (Ultratop 50 Flanders)	22
Europe (European Hot 100 Singles)	33
Ireland (IRMA)	1
Netherlands (Dutch Top 40)	9
Netherlands (Single Top 100)	9
New Zealand (Recorded Music NZ)	2
UK Singles (OCC)	1

=== Year-end charts ===
Chart (1987)	Position
Australia (Australian Music Report)	24
Netherlands (Dutch Top 40)	88
Netherlands (Single Top 100)	97
New Zealand (RIANZ)	20
UK Singles (OCC)	9

== Certifications ==
Region	Certification	Certified units/sales
United Kingdom (BPI)	Silver	250,000^{^}
^{^} Shipments figures based on certification alone.
