= Curiosity Killed the Cat =

British pop band

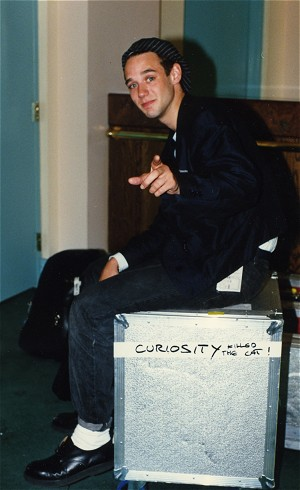
- Ben Volpeliere-Pierrot of Curiosity Killed the Cat at the Lafayette Parc Hotel, Lafayette, California – 1987

Background information
- Also known as: Curiosity
- Origin: London, England
- Genres: Sophisti-pop; funk
- Years active: 1984–1994, 2001–2016
- Labels: Mercury, RCA, BMG
- Past members: Ben Volpeliere-Pierrot; Julian Brookhouse; Nick Thorp; Migi Drummond

Curiosity Killed the Cat were a British pop band formed in London in 1980, comprising singer Ben Volpeliere-Pierrot, guitarist Julian Godfrey Brookhouse, bassist Nick Thorp and drummer Migi Drummond. The band achieved success in the UK in the late 1980s, with their debut album Keep Your Distance reaching No. 1 in 1987 and producing three top 20 hit singles in "Down to Earth", "Misfit" and "Ordinary Day". This was followed by Getahead in 1989, with another UK top 20 single "Name and Number".

In 1991, Thorp left the band, with the remaining three members continuing under the shortened name Curiosity for their third and final album, 1994's Back to Front, which included the UK top 5 single "Hang On in There Baby". The band split in 1994 although there have been occasional temporary reunions.

== Career ==
The band played soulful, jazzy and funky pop music, and was initially signed to Mercury Records. Now inspired by the band Men Without Hats they first came to notice of the UK music press when they worked with Andy Warhol for the video of their 1986 single "Misfit". This featured the band in New York City and at one point featured frontman Ben Volpeliere-Pierrot dancing down a side street whilst Andy Warhol referenced Bob Dylan's 1965 long-form promotional film for "Subterranean Homesick Blues" by dropping pieces of white card in time to the music.

The single was initially unsuccessful but the release of their next single, "Down to Earth", gave the band a top 3 hit in early 1987. The band's first album, Keep Your Distance, entered the UK Albums Chart at No. 1 in April 1987, and stayed in the top ten for 13 weeks. Further singles included "Ordinary Day" (UK No. 11), "Free" (UK No. 56) and a re-release of "Misfit" (UK No. 7). "Misfit" was also their only U.S. charting single, peaking at No. 42.

The band's second album, Getahead, was released in 1989, led by the single "Name and Number" (UK No. 14), and its "hey how you doin'" refrain found itself in the top 10 two years later interpolated in the De La Soul song "Ring Ring Ring (Ha Ha Hey)". The album, however, was not as successful in comparison to their first album, peaking at No. 29.

After the lacklustre performance of Getahead and its second single "First Place", the band shortened their name to 'Curiosity', but were dropped by Mercury Records. Bass player Nick Thorpe then left the band. However, in 1992, the band (now a three-piece and signed to RCA Records) returned to the UK Top 3 with a cover of Johnny Bristol's "Hang On in There Baby". Despite this, the band's follow up singles (covers of "I Need Your Lovin'" and "Gimme the Sunshine") were unsuccessful, which resulted in the album Back to Front only being released in Japan and selected overseas markets in 1994. The band then split up.

In 2001, the band reformed for an appearance on a National Lottery midweek show on BBC 1, and since then Volpeliere has toured under the name Curiosity Killed the Cat, on a number of 1980s revival packages.

In November 2015, a compilation album, called 80's Recovered featured many groups. Curiosity Killed the Cat did a cover of the Doobie Brothers track "Long Train Runnin'", with a regular version, and a remix.

== Band members ==
- Ben Volpeliere-Pierrot – vocals (born Martin Benedict Volpeliere-Pierrot, 19 May 1965, Earls Court, London)
- Julian Godfrey Brookhouse – guitar (born 15 May 1963, Putney, London)
- Nick Thorp – bass guitar, keyboards (born Nicholas Bernard Thorp, 25 October 1964, Sunbury-on-Thames, Middlesex) father of actor Freddie Thorp
- Migi Drummond – drums (born Miguel John Drummond, 27 January 1964, Strawberry Hill, Middlesex)

Lead singer Ben Volpeliere-Pierrot was best known for wearing a beret in most pictures of the band. He later revealed it was in fact a peaked fisherman's hat, turned round with the peak to the rear so that it resembled a beret. Ben VP (as he was billed on a number of solo singles in the mid-1990s) was frequently referred to as 'Ben Vol-au-vent Parrot' in Smash Hits magazine, with 'Bendy Ben' (or 'Boozy Ben') also used. He also appeared as a model on the front of Mike Read's Pop Quiz board game.

In 1995, Migi Drummond and Nick Thorp set up Naked Records which was acquired a year later by software maker Eidos Plc.

Toby Andersen (formerly of Funkapolitan) co-wrote all tracks and played keyboards on the album Keep Your Distance. Session guitarist/keyboard player Mike McEvoy (Michael J McEvoy) co-wrote the songs on their Getahead album and Toto drummer Jeff Porcaro played on three tracks ("Cascade", "Can't Grow Trees on Money" and "Who Are You").

== Discography ==
=== Albums ===
==== Studio albums ====
Title	Album details	Peak chart positions										Certifications
Title	Album details	UK	AUS	AUT	GER	IT	NL	NZ	SWE	SWI	US	Certifications
Keep Your Distance	Released: 27 April 1987; Label: Mercury; Formats: CD, LP, MC	1	47	20	29	8	9	19	32	7	55	UK: Platinum
Getahead	Released: 23 October 1989; Label: Mercury; Formats: CD, LP, MC	29	136	—	—	19	90	—	—	—	—	UK: Silver
Back to Front	Released: 24 March 1994; Label: RCA/BMG; Formats: CD	—	—	—	—	—	—	—	—	—	—	
"—" denotes releases that did not chart or were not released in that territory.

==== Compilation albums ====
Title	Album details
Their Very Best	Released: 1990; Label: Pickwick Music; Formats: CD, MC
The Very Best Of	Released: September 1996; Label: Spectrum Music; Formats: CD
Down to Earth: The Collection	Released: 16 February 2015; Label: Spectrum Music; Formats: CD, digital download
Misfits: The Mercury Years 1986–1990	Released: 21 September 2018; Label: Caroline; Formats: 4xCD box set

==== Video albums ====
Title	Album details
Running the Distance	Released: 1988; Label: PolyGram Music Video; Formats: VHS, CD-V
Live from the Camden Palace	Released: April 2013; Label: The Store for Music; Formats: DVD

=== Singles ===
Title	Year	Peak chart positions										Album
Title	Year	UK	AUS	BE (FL)	GER	IRE	IT	NL	NZ	SWI	US	Album
"Misfit"	1986	76	—	—	—	—	—	—	—	—	—	Keep Your Distance
"Down to Earth"	1986	3	88	24	32	5	—	14	13	—	—	Keep Your Distance
"Ordinary Day"	1987	11	—	—	—	13	9	31	42	24	—	Keep Your Distance
"Misfit" (re-release)	1987	7	97	—	53	8	16	48	—	—	42	Keep Your Distance
"Free"	1987	56	—	—	—	26	—	—	—	—	—	Keep Your Distance
"Name and Number"	1989	14	131	—	—	16	13	31	—	—	—	Getahead
"First Place"	1989	86	—	—	—	—	—	—	—	—	—	Getahead
"Hang On in There Baby" (as Curiosity)	1992	3	127	38	42	10	23	—	—	—	—	Back to Front
"I Need Your Lovin'" (as Curiosity)	1992	47	—	—	55	—	—	—	—	—	—	Back to Front
"Work It Out" (as Curiosity)	1993	—	—	—	—	—	—	—	—	—	—	Back to Front
"Gimme the Sunshine" (as Curiosity)	1993	73	—	—	—	—	—	—	—	—	—	Back to Front
"Long Train Runnin'"	2015	—	—	—	—	—	—	—	—	—	—	80's Re:Covered – Your Songs with the 80's Sound
"—" denotes releases that did not chart or were not released in that territory.
