= The Nips Are Getting Bigger =

Single by Mental As Anything

from the album Get Wet
- B-side: "Instrumental As Anything"
- Released: July 1979 (Australia); November 1979 (UK)
- Genre: Pub rock; drinking song
- Length: 3:23
- Label: Regular Records (AUS), Virgin Records (UK)
- Songwriter: Martin Plaza
- Producer: Cameron Allan

Mental As Anything singles chronology
"The Nips Are Getting Bigger" (1979)	"Possible Theme for a Future TV Drama Series" (1979)

"The Nips Are Getting Bigger" is the debut single by Australian band Mental As Anything, released in July 1979. It was released as the first single from the album Get Wet and the song reached at number 16 on the Kent Music Report. The song was written by Mental As Anything lead vocalist Martin Plaza.

== Reception ==
Trouser Press said the song, "accurately summarizes their pub-rock earthiness and randy humour"

== Track listing ==
Regular Records (K 7548)
No.	Title	Writer(s)	Length
1.	"The Nips Are Getting Bigger"	Martin Plaza	3:23
2.	"Instrumental As Anything"	Martin Plaza	2:29

== Personnel ==
- Martin Plaza — lead vocals, guitar
- Greedy Smith — lead vocals, keyboards, harmonica
- Reg Mombassa — guitar, vocals
- Peter O'Doherty — bass, guitar, vocals
- Wayne de Lisle – drums

== Charts ==
=== Weekly charts ===
Weekly chart performance for "The Nips Are Getting Bigger"
Chart (1979)	Peak position
Australian (Kent Music Report)	16

=== Year-end charts ===
Year-end chart performance for "The Nips Are Getting Bigger"
Chart (1979)	Position
Australia (Kent Music Report)	73
