= You're So Strong =

- 7-inch single UK cover

Single by Mental As Anything

from the album Fundamental
- B-side: "Three Steps To Your Place (Aus); Bus Ride (Uk); Splashing"
- Released: March 1985
- Genre: Rock
- Length: 3:25; 5:29 (Extended version)
- Label: Regular Records, CBS Records, WEA Records, Epic Records
- Songwriter: Greedy Smith
- Producer: Richard Gottehrer

Mental As Anything singles chronology
"Apocalypso (Wiping the Smile Off Santa's Face)" (1984)	"You're So Strong" (1985)	"Live It Up" (1985)

Music video
- "You're So Strong" on YouTube

"You're So Strong" is a song by Australian pop rock band Mental As Anything, released in 1985 through Regular Records. It was released from the band's fifth studio album Fundamental The song was written by vocalist/keyboardist Greedy Smith. The song first charted on 25 March 1985, peaked at No. 11 on the Kent Music Report, and stayed in the charts for eighteen weeks.

== Track listing ==
Regular Records
No.	Title	Writer(s)	Length
1.	"You're So Strong"	Greedy Smith	3:25
2.	"Three Steps To Your Place"	Reg Mombassa	2:29

12" version
No.	Title	Writer(s)	Length
1.	"You're So Strong (Extended Version)"	Greedy Smith	5:30
2.	"You're So Strong (Single Version)"	Greedy Smith	3:25
3.	"You're So Strong (Dub Version)"	Greedy Smith	5:15

UK Track listing
No.	Title	Writer(s)	Length
1.	"You're So Strong (Extended Version)"	Greedy Smith	5:29
2.	"Apocalypso (Wiping The Smile Off Santa's Face)"	Martin Plaza, Reg Mombassa	4:16
3.	"Bus Ride"	Martin Plaza	2:55

== Personnel ==
- Martin Plaza – lead vocals, guitar
- Wayne de Lisle – drums
- Reg Mombassa – guitar, vocals
- Greedy Smith – lead vocals, keyboards, harmonica
- Peter O'Doherty – bass guitar, vocals

== Charts ==
=== Weekly charts ===
Chart (1985/86)	Peak position
Australian (Kent Music Report)	11
United States (Dance Club Songs)	21
United Kingdom (UK Singles Chart)	82

=== Year-end charts ===
Chart (1985)	Position
Australia (Kent Music Report)	92
