= The Firm (novelty band) =

British novelty band

- Origin: London, England
- Genres: Novelty
- Years active: 1982–1987
- Labels: Bark
- Past members: John O'Connor; Grahame Lister; Tony Thorpe; Dev Douglas; Gary Wilson

The Firm was a British music act, formed by guitarist, session musician and music producer John O'Connor, which had hits in the 1980s with novelty songs.

== "Arthur Daley E's Alright" ==
John O'Connor, primarily an acoustic guitarist, ran his own recording studio (Bark Studios in Walthamstow, London) specialising in songwriters' demos, for some ten years. In the early 1980s, he decided to concentrate more on playing and writing music, working as a session musician with artists in a variety of genres, from Maddy Prior and Isla St Clair to the more commercial pop of Bucks Fizz.

In 1982, he and fellow guitarist Grahame Lister wrote a novelty song, "Arthur Daley E's Alright", based on the Arthur Daley character from the British TV series Minder, and including many catchphrases from the show. Unable to find an artist willing to release the song, O'Connor and Lister did it themselves, under the name "The Firm". It spent seven weeks in the UK top 40, peaking at No. 14, and was performed on the TV chart show Top of the Pops on 29 July 1982, featuring former Rubettes guitarist Tony Thorpe on lead vocals.

The song also peaked at number 78 in Australia.

== "Long Live the National" ==
In 1983, with the future of the Grand National horse race in doubt, The Firm released the song "Long Live the National" as a single in support of the campaign to keep the race alive. The single did not chart. The following year they released "Superheroes" written by Lister.

== "Star Trekkin'" ==
In 1987, the group recorded another novelty song, this time based on catchphrases from the Star Trek TV series set to a catchy, childlike tune with an increasingly frantic arrangement. It was rejected by all the record labels which O'Connor approached with it. Believing it to be worth releasing, O'Connor pressed an initial 500 copies on his own label, Bark Music. The record, "Star Trekkin'", spent two weeks at number one in the UK and a total of nine weeks in the UK top 40, and reached No. 3 in Australia, with comparable success in Japan and Europe and worldwide sales of over a million copies.

Though it received substantial airplay on various radio stations throughout the US, the song did not chart on the Billboard Hot 100. (One of the song's phrases, "It's life, Jim, but not as we know it", became so popular that it has often been misattributed to the TV series, but actually originated with "Star Trekkin'".)

On the back of their success with "Star Trekkin'", The Firm released an album, Serious Fun, in 1987, through K-Tel in the UK and Dino Music in Australia. As well as "Star Trekkin'", it included previous singles "Arthur Daley E's Alright", "Superheroes" and "Cash in Hand", plus eight new tracks. In the US, "Star Trekkin'" was released on the Dr. Demento albums Dr. Demento Presents the Greatest Novelty CD of All Time in 1988, Dr. Demento: 20th Anniversary Collection in 1991, and Dr. Demento: Hits from Outer Space in 2006.
