= Live It Up (Mental As Anything song) =

1985 single by Mental As Anything

Single by Mental As Anything

from the album Fundamental
- B-side: "Good Friday"
- Released: 20 May 1985
- Length: 4:15 (album version); 3:50 (radio version)
- Label: WEA
- Songwriter: Greedy Smith
- Producer: Richard Gottehrer

Mental As Anything singles chronology
"You're So Strong" (1985)	"Live It Up" (1985)	"Date with Destiny" (1985)

Music video
- "Live It Up" on YouTube

"Live It Up" is a song by Australian rock band Mental As Anything, released in May 1985 in Australia. Following the song's appearance in the action comedy film Crocodile Dundee, it was released internationally in 1986 and 1987. At the 1985 Countdown Australian Music Awards, the song won Best Single.

== Background ==
"Live It Up" was written by Mental As Anything keyboardist and singer Greedy Smith. Smith did not initially think the song would be a hit when he wrote it, but became more confident as the song was completed; he explained, "You know when I felt that was going to be a hit? When we finished mixing it. It took about half an hour to write in my head. But then two years to get it right. We had no idea of how big it would be."

After the song's success, Smith did not seek to directly replicate its style. He later said, "it's not about duplicating the song, you have to duplicate all the conditions around it. Which is an art in itself. It's not really that possible. It's a bit like cricket. You can't understand how a team can win or lose, but it's just the vibe of it as Michael Caton would say."

== Release and reception ==
"Live It Up" appears on the band's 1985 album, Fundamental. It was released in Australia as the album's second single in May 1985 and quickly climbed the Kent Music Report chart to peak at No. 2 for three weeks behind Madonna's "Angel / Into the Groove". It spent 12 weeks in the Top 10, becoming the fourth biggest-selling single of 1985 in Australia.

The single was later released in 1986 and 1987 in Europe after it was featured in the hit film Crocodile Dundee. "Live It Up" is the band's most successful and most popular song, reaching the top 20 in various countries. The song peaked at No. 2 in Ireland, No. 3 in the UK, No. 4 in Norway, No. 6 in Germany and New Zealand, No. 15 in Austria and No. 20 in Sweden.

Greedy Smith later recounted the single's success. "I remember when 'Live It Up' went to number three in the UK… that was a special moment. It had been a hit in Australia but nobody was interested over there and in Europe. Then, when Crocodile Dundee came out, our record company over there said 'Let's put the poster on the single pack'. After that, it was a huge hit. So we were very grateful to have a bit of a go around there."

"Live It Up" has been placed in the collection of the Australian National Film and Sound Archive, with the song being described as "wistful and yet danceable".

== Use at football matches ==
In 2020, the song became an unofficial anthem of Glasgow based football team Rangers FC to mock their city rivals Celtic FC and in December 2020 Rangers fans began a campaign to get the song to number one in the UK charts for Christmas. strongly affiliated with Rangers community as a positive upbeat anthem

== Track listings ==
7-inch single
No.	Title	Writer(s)	Length
1.	"Live It Up"	Greedy Smith	3:36
2.	"Good Friday"	Martin Plaza	4:27

Australian 12-inch single
No.	Title	Writer(s)	Length
1.	"Live It Up" (extended mix)	Smith	5:49
2.	"Live It Up" (7-inch version)	Smith	4:27
3.	"Three Steps to Your Place"	Reg Mombassa	2:59

European 12-inch single
No.	Title	Writer(s)	Length
1.	"Live It Up" (remix)	Smith	6:06
2.	"Good Friday"	Plaza	4:29

UK 12-inch single
No.	Title	Writer(s)	Length
1.	"Live It Up" (extended remix)	Smith	6:06
2.	"Three Steps to Your Place"	Mombassa	3:00
3.	"Good Friday"	Plaza	4:27

== Charts ==
=== Weekly charts ===
Weekly chart performance for "Live It Up"
Chart (1985–1987)	Peak position
Australia (Kent Music Report)	2
Austria (Ö3 Austria Top 40)	15
Belgium (Ultratop 50 Flanders)	40
Europe (European Hot 100 Singles)	20
Ireland (IRMA)	2
Netherlands (Single Top 100)	42
New Zealand (Recorded Music NZ)	6
Norway (VG-lista)	4
Sweden (Sverigetopplistan)	20
UK Singles (Official Charts)	3
West Germany (GfK)	6

Chart (2020)	Peak position
Scotland Singles (Official Charts)	71

=== Year-end charts ===
1985 year-end chart performance for "Live It Up"
Chart (1985)	Position
Australia (Kent Music Report)	4
New Zealand (RIANZ)	25

1987 year-end chart performance for "Live It Up"
Chart (1987)	Position
European Hot 100 Singles (Music & Media)	78
Norway Spring Period (VG-Lista)	3
UK Singles (OCC)	31
West Germany (Media Control)	58

== Certifications ==
Certifications for "Live It Up "
Region	Certification	Certified units/sales
New Zealand (RMNZ)	Gold	15,000^{‡}
United Kingdom (BPI)	Gold	400,000^{‡}
^{‡} Sales+streaming figures based on certification alone.

== Release history ==
Release dates and formats for "Live It Up"
Region	Date	Format(s)	Label(s)	Ref.
Australia	20 May 1985	7-inch vinyl	WEA	
United Kingdom	5 January 1987	7-inch vinyl; 12-inch vinyl	Epic	
