= Ben Volpeliere-Pierrot =

English singer (born 1965)

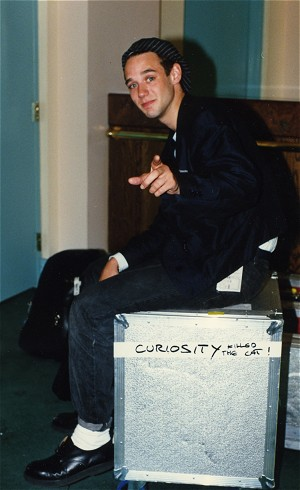
- Ben Volpeliere-Pierrot at the Lafayette Parc Hotel, Lafayette, California – 1987
- Born: Martin Benedict Volpeliere-Pierrot; 19 May 1965 (age 61); Earls Court, London, England
- Years active: 1984–present
- Known for: Lead singer of Curiosity Killed the Cat

Martin Benedict Volpeliere-Pierrot (born 19 May 1965) is an English singer best known as the vocalist from the band Curiosity Killed the Cat. He is known for sporting a distinctive hat often mistaken for a beret, which is actually a fiddler cap – a traditional Greek fisherman's hat – worn backwards.

== Early life ==
Volpeliere-Pierrot is the son of 1960s celebrity photographer Jean Claude Volpeliere-Pierrot and the model Belinda Watson. He attended Woolverstone Hall School near Ipswich, which he credited in a 1987 interview with giving him "real hope" through the education he received. In the mid-1980s he appeared as a model on the front of Mike Read's Pop Quiz board game (made by Waddingtons in 1985) and formed the band Curiosity Killed the Cat.

== Curiosity Killed the Cat ==
Curiosity Killed the Cat were a pop band formed in 1984 which had several hit singles in the UK. At the time of their breakthrough, Volpeliere-Pierrot was known for wearing a peaked fisherman's hat, turned round with the peak to the rear so that it resembled a beret. Ben VP (as he was billed on a number of solo singles in the mid-1990s) was frequently referred to as 'Ben Vol-au-vent Parrot' in Smash Hits magazine, with 'Bendy Ben' (or 'Boozy Ben') also used.

Their 1989 hit "Name and Number" has been sampled and remixed several times, including a version credited to Elements vs Ben VP in 2006.

== Post-Curiosity ==
The band, who had signed to RCA Records/BMG as Curiosity in the early 1990s, split in 1994, with Ben VP signing to Telstar Records to release the 1996 single "Gotta Get You Home".

In 2018, Volpeliere-Pierrot appeared on Channel 4's First Dates.
