= Steuben Hill =

Mountain in New York, United States

- Location within New York Location within the United States

Highest point
- Elevation: 1,138 feet (347 m)
- Coordinates: 43°03′28″N 75°01′27″W

Geography
- Location: NW of Herkimer, Herkimer County, New York, U.S.
- Topo map: USGS Ilion

Steuben Hill is a summit located in Central New York Region of New York located in the Town of Herkimer in Herkimer County, northwest of Herkimer. The hill is the location of approximately 1,000-acre Steuben Hill State Forest, which offers free year-round recreational opportunities in a wildlife conservation area and forest preserve operated by the New York Department of Environmental Conservation.

Steuben Hill and the surrounding area is a massif that includes Hasenclever Hill and Schrader Hill between the villages of Poland to the due north, and in clockwise direction, Newport, Middleville, Herkimer, Millers Grove, the Town of Schuyler, and the City of Utica, all north of the Mohawk River. On the opposite side of the Mohawk River are the villages of Mohawk, Ilion, and Frankfork. The massif blocks direct, easy access between the Mohawk River valley and Utica, to the south and the Adirondack Mountains to the north.

The hill is named for Baron Friedrich Wilhelm von Steuben, who was the drillmaster in the American Revolution.

== See also ==
- New York energy law
- Herkimer diamond
- Hunting license
- Little Falls Formation
- New York State Forests
- New York State Wildlife Management Areas
- Steuben Memorial State Historic Site
