= Dan Aykroyd =

Canadian and American actor and musician (born 1952)

Dan Aykroyd CM OOnt
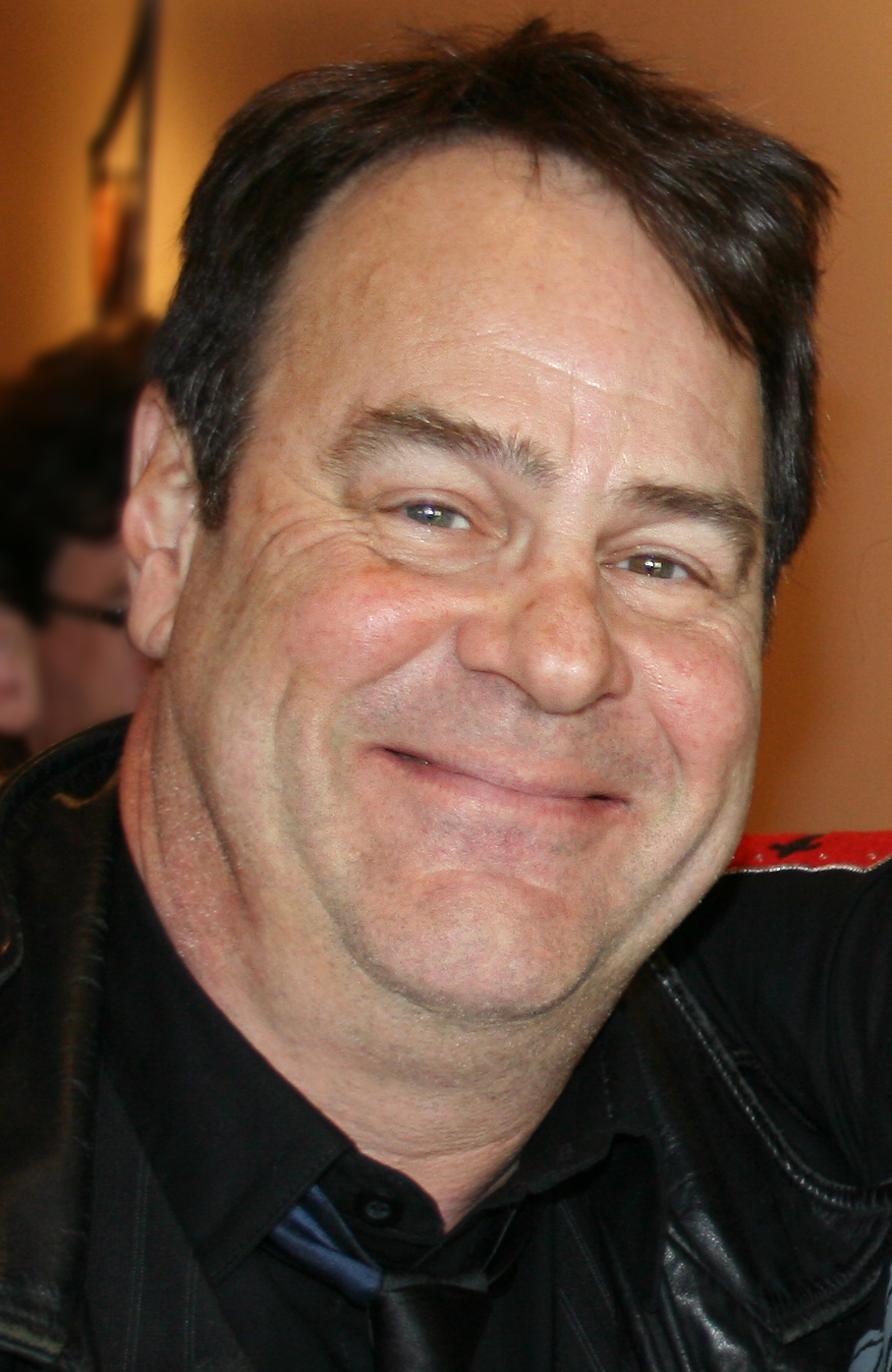
- Aykroyd in 2009
- Born: Daniel Edward Aykroyd; July 1, 1952 (age 74); Ottawa, Ontario, Canada
- Citizenship: Canada; United States
- Occupations: Actor; comedian; screenwriter; musician; film producer
- Years active: 1971–present
- Spouse: Donna Dixon (m. 1983; sep. 2022)
- Children: 3, including Vera Sola
- Relatives: Peter Aykroyd (brother)

Daniel Edward Aykroyd (/ˈækrɔɪd/ AK-royd; born July 1, 1952) is a Canadian and American actor, comedian, screenwriter, musician and producer.

Aykroyd was a writer and an original member of the "Not Ready for Prime Time Players" cast on the NBC sketch comedy series Saturday Night Live from its inception in 1975 until his departure in 1979. During his tenure on SNL, he appeared in a recurring series of sketches, including the Coneheads and the Blues Brothers. For his work on the show, he received five Primetime Emmy Award nominations, winning for Outstanding Writing for a Variety Series in 1977. Since his departure, he has returned for guest roles.

Aykroyd's most famous roles are as Elwood J. Blues in The Blues Brothers (1980) and Blues Brothers 2000 (1998), and Dr. Raymond "Ray" Stantz in Ghostbusters (1984) and Ghostbusters II (1989). He reprised his role in various projects within the Ghostbusters franchise. He is also known for his comedic roles in 1941 (1979), Trading Places (1983), Spies Like Us (1985), Dragnet (1987), The Great Outdoors (1988), Nothing but Trouble (1991) and Coneheads (1993).

In 1990, he was nominated for the Academy Award for Best Supporting Actor for his role as Boolie Werthan in Driving Miss Daisy (1989). Other dramatic roles include My Girl (1991), Chaplin (1992), North (1994), and Pearl Harbor (2001). Aykroyd has had supporting roles in comedy films such as Tommy Boy (1995), Grosse Pointe Blank (1997), Loser (2000), Evolution (2001), 50 First Dates (2004), Christmas with the Kranks (2004), I Now Pronounce You Chuck & Larry (2007), and Tammy (2014).

He starred as Reverend Mike Weber in the sitcom Soul Man (1997–1998). He has made guest appearances on various television shows, including The Nanny (1994), According to Jim (2002–2009), Living with Fran (2006), The Defenders (2011) and Workin' Moms (2017–2023). Aykroyd is also a businessman, having co-founded the House of Blues chain of music venues and the Crystal Head Vodka brand.

== Early life ==
Aykroyd was born on July 1, 1952, at Ottawa General Hospital in Ottawa, Ontario. His father, Samuel Cuthbert Peter Hugh Aykroyd (1922–2020), a civil engineer, worked as a policy adviser to Canadian Prime Minister Pierre Elliott Trudeau, and his mother, Lorraine Hélène Marie (née Gougeon; 1918–2018), was a secretary. His mother was of French Canadian descent and his father of English, Scottish, Irish, French, and Dutch ancestry. His paternal ancestor was Englishman Samuel Aykroyd from Halifax, Yorkshire, who emigrated to the United States, eventually settling in Upper Canada near Kingston, Ontario, in 1810. His brother, Peter (1955–2021), was also an actor.

He attended St. Pius X and St. Patrick's High Schools, and studied criminology and sociology at Carleton University but dropped out before completing his degree. He worked as a comedian in various Canadian nightclubs and ran an after-hours speakeasy, Club 505, in Toronto for several years.

Aykroyd developed his musical career in Ottawa, particularly through his regular attendance at Le Hibou, a club that featured many blues artists. He describes these influences:

There was a little disco club there called Le Hibou, which in French means "the owl." And it was run by a gentleman named Harvey Glatt, and he brought every, and I mean every, blues star that you or I would ever have wanted to have seen through Ottawa in the late '50s, well I guess more late '60s sort of, in around the Newport jazz rediscovery. I was going to Le Hibou and hearing James Cotton, Otis Spann, Pinetop Perkins, and Muddy Waters. I did actually jam behind Muddy Waters. S. P. Leary left the drum kit one night, and Muddy said "anybody out there play drums? I don't have a drummer." And I walked on stage and we started, I don't know, Little Red Rooster, something. He said "keep that beat going, you make Muddy feel good." And I heard Howlin' Wolf (Chester Burnett). Many, many times I saw Howlin' Wolf. As well as the Doors. And of course Buddy Guy, Buddy Guy and Junior Wells, Sonny Terry and Brownie McGhee. So I was exposed to all of these players, playing there as part of this scene to service the academic community in Ottawa, a very well-educated community. Had I lived in a different town I don't think that this would have happened, because it was just the confluence of educated government workers, and then also all the colleges in the area, Ottawa University, Carleton, and all the schools—these people were interested in blues culture.

Aykroyd's first professional experience, which he gained at the age of 17, was as a member of the cast of the short-lived Canadian sketch comedy series The Hart and Lorne Terrific Hour, with Lorne Michaels, among others. He was a member of the Second City comedy troupe in 1973 in both Toronto and Chicago.

== Career ==
=== Saturday Night Live ===
Aykroyd gained fame on the American late-night comedy show Saturday Night Live (SNL). He was originally hired, and paid $278 a week (equivalent to $1,603 in 2024), as a writer, but became part of the cast before the series premiered. The original cast was called "The Not Ready For Prime Time Players". Aykroyd appeared on the show for its first four seasons, from 1975 to 1979. He brought a sensibility that combined youth, unusual interests, talent as an impersonator, and manic intensity. Guest host Eric Idle of Monty Python said that Aykroyd's ability to write and act out characters made him the only member of the SNL cast capable of being a Python.

He was known for his impersonations of celebrities such as Jimmy Carter, Vincent Price, Richard Nixon, Rod Serling, Tom Snyder, and Julia Child. He was also known for his recurring roles, such as Beldar, father of the Coneheads family; with Steve Martin, Yortuk Festrunk, one of the "Two Wild and Crazy Guys" brothers from Bratislava, Slovakia; sleazy late-night cable TV host E. Buzz Miller and his cousin, corrupt maker of children's toys and costumes Irwin Mainway (who extolled the virtues and defended the safety of the "Bag-o-Glass" toy); Fred Garvin, a male prostitute; and high-bred but lowbrow critic Leonard Pinth-Garnell. Aykroyd and Jane Curtin parodied the CBS news show 60 Minutes Point/Counterpoint segment, which featured the liberal Shana Alexander and the conservative segregationist James Kilpatrick, by portraying the two as hating each other; Aykroyd's first words in response to Curtin's point were, "Jane, you ignorant slut!"

Aykroyd's eccentric talent was recognized by others in the highly competitive SNL environment; when he first presented his "Super Bass-O-Matic '76" sketch, a fake TV commercial in which a garish pitchman based on Ron Popeil touts a food blender that turns an entire bass into liquid pulp, the other writers and cast members considered the sketch "so exhilaratingly strange that many remember sitting and listening, open-mouthed... Nobody felt jealous of it because they couldn't imagine writing anything remotely like it." Aykroyd later said the sketch was inspired by seeing his aunt Helene Gougeon (a culinary writer and food columnist in Montreal) put a bass into a blender to make a bouillabaisse when he was 12 years old.

Aykroyd was a close friend and partner of fellow cast member John Belushi and shared some of his sensibilities, but was more reserved and less self-destructive. Aykroyd later recalled that, unlike Belushi and others of his peers, he was uninterested in recreational drug use.

In 1977, he received an Emmy Award for writing on SNL; he later received two more nominations for writing and one for acting. In Rolling Stone's February 2015 appraisal of all 141 SNL cast members to date, Aykroyd ranked fifth (behind Belushi, Eddie Murphy, Tina Fey, and Mike Myers). "Of all the original greats, Aykroyd is the least imitated", they wrote, "because nobody else can do what he did."

In later decades, Aykroyd made occasional guest appearances and unannounced cameos on SNL, playing the politician Bob Dole and talk show host Tom Snyder. He also brought back characters including Irwin Mainway and Leonard Pinth-Garnell. In 1995, he introduced a performance by Canadian rock band The Tragically Hip. A fan of the band, he had personally lobbied Lorne Michaels to book them as musical guests.

During some guest appearances, he resurrected the Blues Brothers musical act with frequent host John Goodman in place of Belushi, who was by then deceased. He became the second member of the original cast to host SNL in May 2003, when he appeared in the season finale. During his monologue, he performed a musical number with James Belushi similar to the Blues Brothers, but neither man donned the black suit and sunglasses. On March 24, 2007, Aykroyd appeared as a crying fan of American Idol finalist Sanjaya Malakar (played by Andy Samberg) during "Weekend Update". On February 14, 2009, he appeared as U.S. House Minority leader John Boehner. Aykroyd also made a surprise guest appearance, along with many other SNL alumni, on the show of March 9, 2013.

=== The Blues Brothers ===
Backed by such experienced professional R&B sidemen as lead guitarist Steve Cropper, sax man Lou Marini, trumpeter Alan Rubin, and bass guitarist Donald "Duck" Dunn, The Blues Brothers proved more than an SNL novelty. Taking off with the public as a legitimate musical act, they performed live gigs and in 1978 released the hit album Briefcase Full of Blues (drawn from the fact that Aykroyd, as "Elwood Blues", carried his blues harmonicas in a briefcase handcuffed to his wrist in the manner of a CIA courier; Belushi originally carried the key to the handcuffs). Briefcase Full of Blues sold 3.5 million copies and is one of the highest-selling blues albums of all time. The band was much further popularised by the 1980 film The Blues Brothers, which Aykroyd co-wrote. A sequel, Blues Brothers 2000, was released in 1998 with John Goodman as Belushi's replacement.

Cherokee Studios in Los Angeles was a regular haunt for the original Blues Brothers in their early days. Belushi and Aykroyd became fixtures at the recording studio, while Blues Brothers band member Steve Cropper called Cherokee his producing home. When they needed a bass player, they were joined by another band member, Donald "Duck" Dunn. During this time, Cropper, along with producing partner and Cherokee owner Bruce Robb, worked on a number of music projects with the two comedians/musicians, including Belushi's favourite band, Fear, and later Aykroyd's movie Dragnet.

The Blues Brothers Band continues to tour, both with and without Aykroyd. It features original members Cropper and Marini, along with vocalist Eddie Floyd. Aykroyd sometimes performs as Elwood, along with Belushi's younger brother Jim Belushi, who plays "Brother Zee" on stage. They are most frequently backed by the Sacred Hearts Band.

=== Other film and television work ===
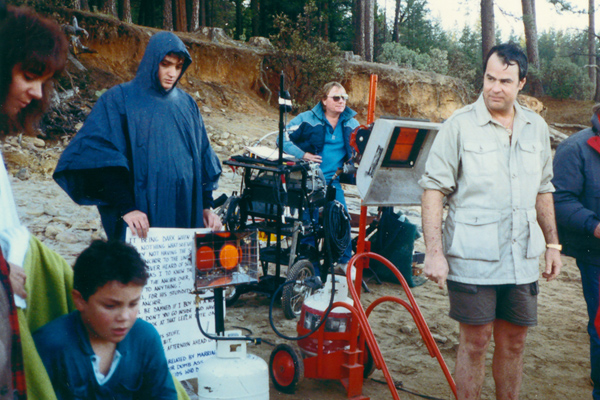
Aykroyd (right) on the set of The Great Outdoors, 1987

Concurrent with his work in Saturday Night Live, Aykroyd played Purvis Bickle, lift operator at the fictitious office block 99 Sumach Street in the CBC Television series Coming Up Rosie.

After leaving SNL, Aykroyd starred in a number of films, mostly comedies, with uneven results both commercially and artistically. His first three American feature films all co-starred Belushi. The first, 1941 (1979), directed by Steven Spielberg, was a box-office disappointment. The second, The Blues Brothers (1980), which he co-wrote with director John Landis, was a massive hit. The third, Neighbors (1981), had a mixed critical reaction but was another box-office hit. One of his best-received performances was as a blueblood-turned-wretch in the 1983 comedy Trading Places, in which he co-starred with fellow SNL alumnus Eddie Murphy and Jamie Lee Curtis. He also appeared in Twilight Zone: The Movie in the prologue and at the end of Segment Four as the passenger and the ambulance driver.

In the early 1980s, Aykroyd began work on a script for the film that eventually became Ghostbusters, inspired by his fascination with parapsychology and his belief in ghosts. The script initially included a much greater fantasy element, including time travel, but this was toned down substantially through work on the script with Harold Ramis, who became a co-writer, and director Ivan Reitman. Aykroyd originally wrote the role of Dr. Peter Venkman with Belushi in mind, but rewrote it for Bill Murray after Belushi's death. Aykroyd joked that the green ghost, later known as "Slimer", was the ghost of John Belushi and based on Belushi's party-animal personality. Ghostbusters was released in 1984 and became a huge success for Aykroyd, who appeared as one of the lead actors. The film earned nearly US$300 million on a US$30 million budget. Aykroyd also briefly appeared in the hit 1984 action-adventure film Indiana Jones and the Temple of Doom as an escort with a British accent.

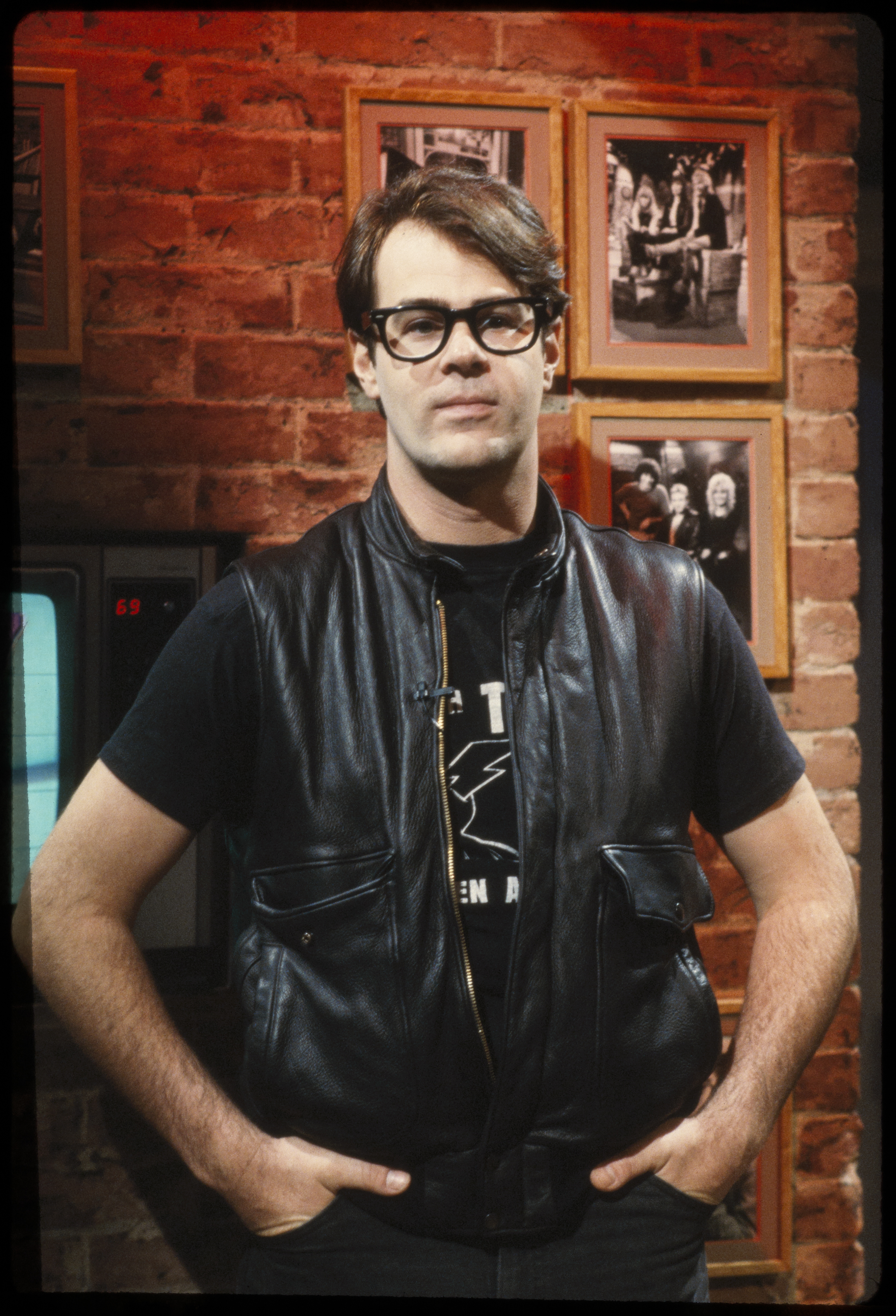
Aykroyd as a guest MTV VJ in 1982

Aykroyd's next major film role was in the 1985 spy comedy film Spies Like Us, which like The Blues Brothers was co-conceived and co-written by Aykroyd and directed by Landis. Aykroyd had again intended for Belushi to be the other lead in the film; the part was given to SNL alumnus Chevy Chase. The film was intended as an homage to the Bob Hope/Bing Crosby Road to ... movies of the 1940s to 1960s. Hope made a cameo appearance in the film.

Dragnet, in which Aykroyd co-starred (with Tom Hanks) and which he co-wrote, was released in 1987. The film was both an homage and a satire of the previous Dragnet series, with Aykroyd playing Joe Friday as a police officer whose law-and-order attitude is at odds with modern sensibilities.

In 1988, Aykroyd co-starred with John Candy in the comedy film The Great Outdoors. He appeared in four other films released in 1988 (The Couch Trip, She's Having a Baby, Caddyshack II, and My Stepmother Is an Alien), all of them critical and commercial failures. His performance in Caddyshack II won him the Golden Raspberry Award for Worst Supporting Actor.

A sequel to Ghostbusters, Ghostbusters II, was released in 1989; Aykroyd and the other co-creators were reluctant to make another Ghostbusters film, but succumbed to pressure from the film's studio, Columbia Pictures. The film, while considered inferior to the original, was another big hit, earning US$215 million. Aykroyd was nominated for an Academy Award for Best Supporting Actor for 1989's Driving Miss Daisy. He was the fourth SNL cast member to be nominated for an Oscar, after Joan Cusack.

Aykroyd's directorial debut was 1991's Nothing but Trouble starring Demi Moore, Chevy Chase, John Candy, and Aykroyd, sporting a bulbous prosthetic nose. The film was a critical and box-office flop, and Aykroyd won a second Razzie for Worst Supporting Actor. Most of Aykroyd's other films in the 1990s were similarly poorly received, including Chaplin (1992), Coneheads (1993, also based on a SNL skit), North (1994), Exit to Eden (1994), Canadian Bacon (1995), Getting Away with Murder (1996), and Blues Brothers 2000 (1998). Four exceptions were My Girl (1991), which starred Jamie Lee Curtis and Macaulay Culkin; Sneakers (1992), which starred Robert Redford; Tommy Boy (1995), which starred SNL alumni David Spade and Chris Farley, in which Aykroyd played the role of Ray Zalinsky; and Grosse Pointe Blank (1997), in which Aykroyd had a well-received role as a rival hit man.

In 1994, Aykroyd made a guest appearance in an episode of the sitcom The Nanny as a refrigerator repairman. In 1997, he starred as an Episcopal priest in the ABC sitcom Soul Man, which lasted two seasons. In 1998, he voiced the role of Chip, a wasp, in the DreamWorks Animation film Antz.

In 2001, Aykroyd starred in the Woody Allen film The Curse of the Jade Scorpion. Most of his subsequent film roles have tended to be small character parts in big-budget productions, such as a father in Loser (2000), Governor Lewis in Evolution (2001), a signals analyst in Pearl Harbor (2001), a neurologist in 50 First Dates (2004), an annoying neighbor in Christmas with the Kranks (2004), and a fire captain in I Now Pronounce You Chuck & Larry (2007).

In 2009, Aykroyd and Ramis wrote and appeared in Ghostbusters: The Video Game, which also featured Bill Murray, Ernie Hudson, Annie Potts, William Atherton, and Brian Doyle-Murray. In 2010, he played the voice of the title character, Yogi Bear, in the live-action/CGI-animated-film Yogi Bear. That same year, Aykroyd and Chevy Chase guest-starred in the Family Guy episode "Spies Reminiscent of Us", an homage to Spies Like Us.

Other television series that Aykroyd appeared in include According to Jim (2002–2009, which starred Jim Belushi), Living with Fran (2006), and Workin' Moms (2017–2023). Aykroyd appeared in two 2011 episodes of CBS's The Defenders as Judge Max Hunter, which also starred Jim Belushi. He also appeared on Top Chef Canada as a guest judge. He had supporting roles in the 2012 political comedy film The Campaign, which starred SNL alum Will Ferrell, and in the 2013 HBO film Behind the Candelabra. In 2014, Aykroyd voiced the role of Scarecrow in Legends of Oz: Dorothy's Return, and had a supporting role in the comedy film Tammy.

In 2015, Aykroyd appeared in a State Farm insurance commercial along with Jane Curtin and Laraine Newman, as the Coneheads, talking to "Jake", a State Farm agent, and played the emcee of the video game championship in the science fiction comedy film Pixels (2015). Aykroyd was one of the executive producers of Ghostbusters (2016), a long-discussed reboot of the Ghostbusters franchise. He had a cameo appearance in the film, along with many of the rest of the surviving original Ghostbusters cast.

In 2021, Aykroyd provided the voice of the Postage Stamp Fellow in the episode The Dad-Feelings Limited in the TV series The Simpsons. He also reprised his role of Dr. Ray Stantz in the movie Ghostbusters: Afterlife (2021). In 2023, he began hosting the series The UnBelievable with Dan Aykroyd on the History Channel. Aykroyd expressed interest in having the surviving three actors of the original Ghostbusters reprising their roles for as many sequels as possible. He again reprised his role in Ghostbusters: Frozen Empire (2024).

=== Other musical endeavours ===
Aykroyd participated in the recording of "We Are the World" in 1985, as a member of the chorus. He wrote the liner notes for fellow Ottawa-born blues musician JW-Jones's album Bluelisted in 2008. Until it ended in 2018, he hosted the internationally syndicated radio show "Elwood's BluesMobile", formerly known as the House of Blues Radio Hour, under his Blues Brothers moniker Elwood Blues.

== Business ventures ==
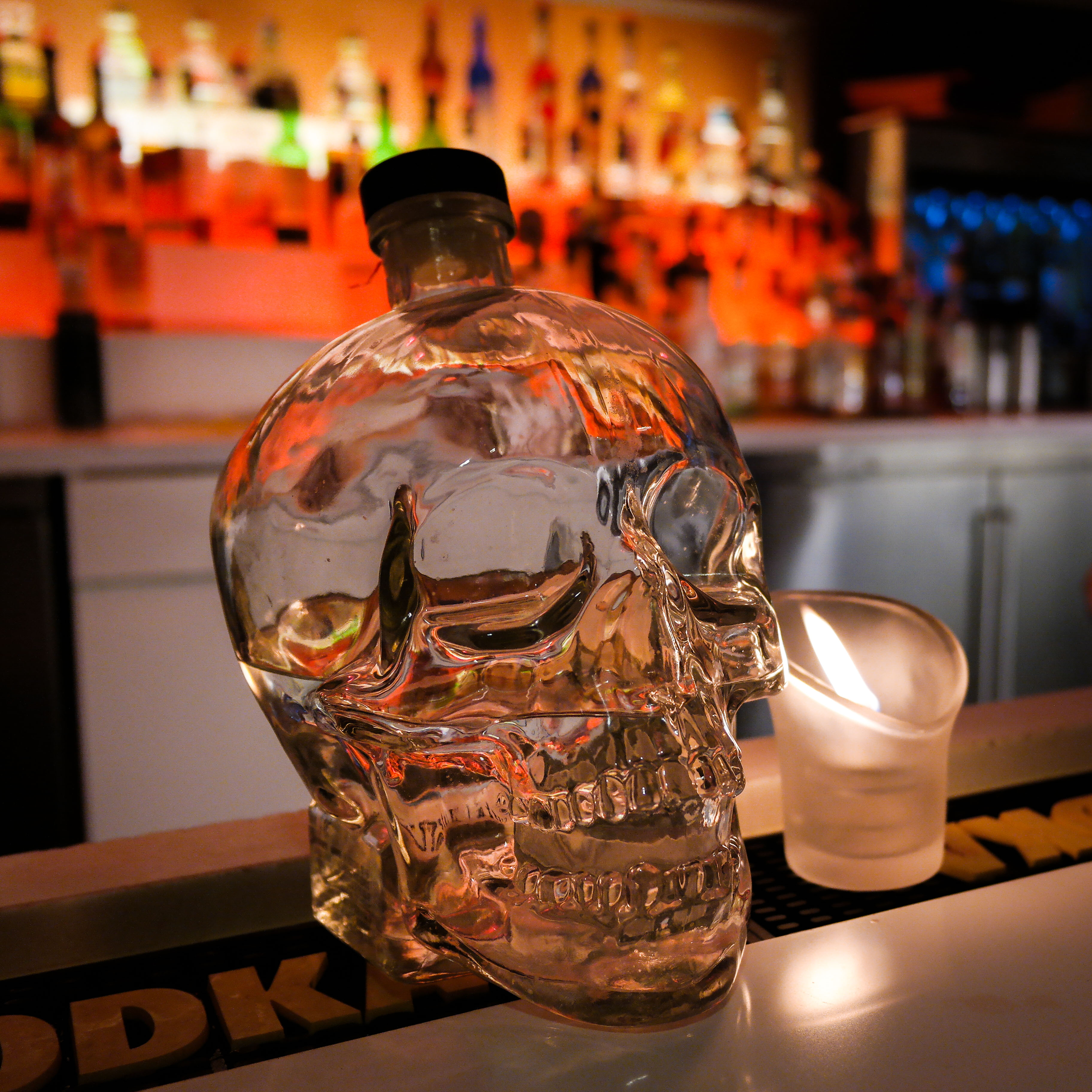
A bottle of Crystal Head vodka

In 1992, Aykroyd and Hard Rock Cafe co-founder Isaac Tigrett founded the House of Blues, a chain of music venues, with the mission to host all genres of musical performances with a primary theme focused on blues music and folk art.

Many other music and Hollywood personalities helped to finance this chain at its start. It began as a single location in Cambridge, Massachusetts, although other locations quickly followed, starting with a venue in New Orleans in 1994. On New Year's Eve that year, Aykroyd opened the "Aykroyd's Ghetto House Cafe" featuring one of the eight police cars from the first Blues Brothers movie protruding from the second story, on Princess Street in Kingston, Ontario.

In 2004, "House of Blues" became the second-largest live music promoter in the world, with seven venues and 22 amphitheatres in the United States and Canada. It was bought by Live Nation in 2006. In 2007, Aykroyd and artist John Alexander founded Crystal Head Vodka, a brand of high-end vodka known for its skull-shaped bottle and for being filtered through Herkimer diamond crystals.

In 2016, Aykroyd partnered with TV producers Eric Bischoff and Jason Hervey and game developer Ike McFadden to release an online-casino game that features the Blues Brothers. He provided the in-game voice of Elwood Blues via voiceover. Aykroyd is also owner in part of several wineries in Canada's Niagara Peninsula, and the company that distributes Patrón tequila in Canada.

== Charitable works ==
In 2009, Aykroyd contributed a series of reminiscences about his upbringing in Canada for a charity album, Dan Aykroyd's Canada. He helped start the Blue Line Foundation, which is redeveloping flood-damaged lots in New Orleans and helping first responders buy them at reduced prices. Coastal Blue Line LLC, hopes to eventually rebuild 400 properties in New Orleans.

Aykroyd was a member of Canadian charity Artists Against Racism.

== Personal life ==
Aykroyd was briefly engaged to actress Carrie Fisher, proposing to her on the set of The Blues Brothers. In the film, she appeared as a jilted girlfriend of John Belushi's character, Jake Blues. Their engagement ended when she reconciled with her former boyfriend, musician Paul Simon. On April 29, 1983, Aykroyd married actress Donna Dixon on a friend's rooftop in Martha's Vineyard. The couple met on the set of Doctor Detroit and appeared together in four additional films: Twilight Zone: The Movie (1983), Spies Like Us (1985), The Couch Trip (1988), and Exit to Eden (1994). Together they have three daughters, including Danielle, known by her stage name, Vera Sola. In 2022, the couple announced that they were separating but would remain legally married.

Aykroyd maintains his Canadian roots as a longtime resident of Sydenham, Ontario, with his estate on Loughborough Lake.

In a 2004 NPR interview with host Terry Gross, Aykroyd said he had been diagnosed in childhood with Tourette syndrome (TS). He said his TS was successfully treated with therapy. In 2015, he said in an interview on HuffPost with hosts Roy Sekoff and Marc Lamont Hill that he has Asperger syndrome which was "never diagnosed", but was "sort of a self-diagnosis" based on several of his own characteristics, contradicting his earlier claim in the Daily Mail that he had been officially diagnosed in the early 1980s after his wife Donna persuaded him to see a doctor. Aykroyd's family members noticed a pattern of behavior consistent with the syndrome when he was in middle school and was evaluated by a psychologist, but the condition had not yet been identified at the time.

Aykroyd is a former reserve commander for the police department in Harahan, Louisiana, working for Chief of Police Peter Dale. While on the force, he carried his badge with him at all times. He currently serves as a reserve deputy of the Hinds County Sheriff's Department in Hinds County, Mississippi. He supports the reserves with a fundraiser concert along with other blues and gospel singers in Mississippi.

Aykroyd's passions for the outdoors, geology and paleontology, which he attributes to watching his father work on constructing the Gatineau Parkway which included blasting through granite rock formations to run the highway. This led him to join Canadian paleontologist Philip J. Currie on a number of digs, including fundraising digs and galas as fundraisers for the construction of the Philip J. Currie Dinosaur Museum in Wembley, Alberta, which recognised Aykroyd's contributions by naming its theatre the Aykroyd Family Theatre.

Aykroyd has obtained American citizenship. In September 2026, Aykroyd revealed that he had emergency surgery on his foot due to an infection which prompted him to delay his upcoming tour of his book "Soulhider" to May 18, 2027.

=== Friendship with John Belushi ===
Aykroyd was a close friend of John Belushi. According to Aykroyd, their first meeting helped spark the Blues Brothers act. When they met in a club that Aykroyd frequented, he played a blues record in the background, and it stimulated a fascination with blues in Belushi, who was primarily a fan of heavy rock bands at the time. Aykroyd educated Belushi on the finer points of blues music, and with a little encouragement from then-SNL music director Paul Shaffer, it led to the creation of their Blues Brothers characters.

In an appearance on the Today show, Aykroyd called Belushi and himself "kindred spirits". In the biography Belushi, Aykroyd claims that Belushi was the only man with whom he could ever dance. The pair were scheduled to present the Academy Award for Visual Effects in 1982, but Belushi died a few weeks before the ceremony. Devastated by his friend's death, Aykroyd presented the award alone, saying from the stage, "My partner would have loved to have been here to present this, given that he was something of a visual effect himself."

Aykroyd was an outspoken critic of the 1989 film Wired, a biopic of Belushi based on the 1984 book of the same name by Bob Woodward and starring Michael Chiklis in his film debut as Belushi and Gary Groomes as Aykroyd. Along with Belushi's widow Judith, his brother Jim, and many other friends, associates and relatives of Belushi, he boycotted the film and the associated book for misrepresenting Belushi's life. In an interview for MTV's The Big Picture in June 1988, he expressed his desire that the film would underperform at the box office, which ultimately happened. He said, "I have witches working now to jinx the thing... I hope it never gets seen and I am going to hurl all the negative energy I can and muster all my hell energies. My thunderbolts are out on this one, quite truthfully." He had actor J. T. Walsh removed from the film Loose Cannons after Walsh had already done two days of filming, after finding out that Walsh had been in the cast of Wired. Walsh, who had played Woodward in Wired, was replaced by Paul Koslo, causing the film a $125,000 production delay.

=== Beliefs ===
Aykroyd considers himself a Spiritualist, stating:

I am a Spiritualist, a proud wearer of the Spiritualist badge. Mediums and psychic research have gone on for many, many years ... Loads of people have seen spirits, heard a voice, or felt the cold temperature. I believe that they are between here and there, that they exist between the fourth and fifth dimensions, and that they visit us frequently.

Aykroyd's great-grandfather, a dentist, was a mystic who corresponded with author Sir Arthur Conan Doyle on the subject of Spiritualism, and was a member of the Lily Dale Society. Other than Spiritualism, Aykroyd is also interested in various other aspects of the paranormal, particularly UFOlogy. He is a lifetime member of and official Hollywood consultant for the Mutual UFO Network (MUFON). Along these lines, he served, from 1996 to 2000, as host of Psi Factor: Chronicles of the Paranormal, which claimed to describe cases drawn from the archives of "The Office of Scientific Investigation and Research". In 2005, Aykroyd produced the DVD Dan Aykroyd: Unplugged on UFOs.

Aykroyd was interviewed for 80 minutes by UFOlogist David Sereda, discussing in depth many aspects of the UFO phenomenon.

In September 2009, Peter Aykroyd Sr., Dan's father, published a book entitled A History of Ghosts. This book chronicled the family's historical involvement in the Spiritualist movement, to which Aykroyd readily refers. Aykroyd wrote the introduction and accompanied his father on a series of promotional activities, including launches in New York and Toronto, appearances on Larry King Live and Coast to Coast AM, and other public-relations initiatives. Aykroyd also read the introduction for the audio version of the book.

In 1997, the Committee for Skeptical Inquiry awarded Aykroyd in absentia the Snuffed Candle Award for hosting Psi Factor and being a "long-time promoter ... of paranormal claims". Following the awards, Joe Nickell wrote to Aykroyd asking for the research behind the "cases" presented on Psi Factor, particularly a claim that NASA scientists were "killed while investigating a meteor crash and giant eggs were found and incubated, yielding a flea the size of a hog".

== Filmography ==
=== Film ===
Year	Title	Role	Notes
1976	Love at First Sight	Roy	
1979	Mr. Mike's Mondo Video	Jack Lord Priest / Himself	
1979	1941	Motor Sergeant Frank Tree	
1980	The Blues Brothers	Elwood J. Blues	Also writer
1981	Neighbors	Vic Zeck	
1982	It Came from Hollywood	Himself	Documentary
1983	Doctor Detroit	Clifford Skridlow / Doctor Detroit	
1983	Trading Places	Louis Winthorpe III	
1983	Twilight Zone: The Movie	Passenger / Ambulance Driver	
1984	Indiana Jones and the Temple of Doom	Art Weber	
1984	Ghostbusters	Dr. Raymond Stantz	Also writer
1984	Nothing Lasts Forever	Buck Heller	
1985	Into the Night	Herb	
1985	Spies Like Us	Austin Millbarge	Also writer
1987	Dragnet	Sergeant Joe Friday	Also writer
1988	The Couch Trip	John W. Burns Jr.	
1988	She's Having a Baby	Roman Craig	Uncredited cameo
1988	The Great Outdoors	Roman Craig	
1988	Caddyshack II	Captain Tom Everett	
1988	My Stepmother Is an Alien	Steven Mills	
1989	Ghostbusters II	Dr. Raymond Stantz	Also writer
1989	Driving Miss Daisy	Boolie Werthan	
1990	Loose Cannons	Detective Ellis Fielding	
1990	Masters of Menace	Johnny Lewis	
1991	Nothing but Trouble	Judge Alvin "J.P" Valkenheiser / Bobo	Also writer and director
1991	My Girl	Harry Sultenfuss	
1992	Chaplin	Mack Sennett	
1992	Sneakers	Darren "Mother" Roskow	
1992	This Is My Life	Arnold Moss	
1993	Coneheads	Beldar Conehead	Also writer
1994	A Century of Cinema	Himself	Documentary
1994	My Girl 2	Harry Sultenfuss	
1994	North	Pa Tex	
1994	Exit to Eden	Fred Lavery	
1995	Canadian Bacon	OPP Officer	Uncredited cameo
1995	Casper	Dr. Raymond Stantz	Uncredited cameo
1995	The Random Factor	Dexter	Voice role
1995	Tommy Boy	Ray Zalinsky	
1996	Rainbow	Sheriff Wyatt Hampton	
1996	Celtic Pride	Jimmy Flaherty	
1996	Feeling Minnesota	Detective Ben Costikyan	
1996	My Fellow Americans	President Bill Haney	
1996	Getting Away with Murder	Jack Lambert	
1996	Sgt. Bilko	Colonel John T. Hall	
1997	Grosse Pointe Blank	Grocer	
1998	Antz	Chip	Voice role
1998	Blues Brothers 2000	Elwood J. Blues	Also writer and producer
1998	Susan's Plan	Bob	
1999	Diamonds	Lance Agensky	
2000	The House of Mirth	Gus Trenor	
2000	Loser	Dad	
2000	Stardom	Barry Levine	
2001	The Curse of the Jade Scorpion	Chris Magruder	
2001	Evolution	Governor Lewis	
2001	The Frank Truth	Himself	Documentary
2001	On the Nose	Dr. Barry Davis	
2001	Pearl Harbor	Captain Harold Thurman	
2002	Crossroads	Pete Wagner	
2002	Unconditional Love	Max Beasly	
2003	Bright Young Things	Lord Monomark	
2004	50 First Dates	Dr. Joseph Keats	
2004	Intern Academy	Dr. Cyrill Kipp	
2004	Christmas with the Kranks	Vic Frohmeyer	
2007	I Now Pronounce You Chuck & Larry	Captain Phineas Tucker	
2007	Shortcut to Happiness	Julius Jenson	
2008	War, Inc.	The Former Vice President	
2010	Yogi Bear	Yogi Bear	Voice role
2012	The Campaign	Wade Motch	
2012	The Ultimate Sacrifice	Narrator	Voice; Documentary
2013	Behind the Candelabra	Seymour Heller	
2014	Legends of Oz: Dorothy's Return	Scarecrow	Voice role
2014	Tammy	Don	
2014	Get On Up	Ben Bart	
2015	Pixels	1982 Championship MC	Cameo
2015	Being Canadian	Himself	Documentary
2016	Ghostbusters	Taxi Driver	Cameo; Also executive producer
2019	Cleanin' Up the Town: Remembering Ghostbusters	Himself	Documentary
2021	Ghostbusters: Afterlife	Dr. Raymond Stantz	Also executive producer
2023	Zombie Town	Len Carver	
2024	Ghostbusters: Frozen Empire	Dr. Raymond Stantz	Also executive producer
2025	John Candy: I Like Me	Himself	Documentary
2025	You Had to Be There	Himself	Documentary
2026	I'm Chevy Chase and You're Not	Himself	Documentary

=== Television ===
Year	Title	Role	Notes
1974	The Gift of Winter	Goodly / Rotten / Maple	Television short; Voice
1975–1978	Coming Up Rosie	Purvis Bickle	32 episodes
1975–1979	Saturday Night Live	Various Roles	87 episodes
1976	The Beach Boys: It's OK!	Cop	Television film; also writer
1978	All You Need Is Cash	Brian Thigh	Television film
1986–1991	The Real Ghostbusters		Creator
1990	The Dave Thomas Comedy Show	Various	Episode 1.2
1990	It's Garry Shandling's Show	Boolie Shandling	Episode: "Driving Miss Garry"
1990	The Earth Day Special	Vic's Buddy	Special
1991	Tales from the Crypt	Captain Mulligan	Episode: "Yellow"
1994	The Nanny	Repair Man	Episode: "Sunday in the Park with Fran"
1995	Kelsey Grammer Salutes Jack Benny	Himself	Special
1996–2000	Psi Factor: Chronicles of the Paranormal	Himself (host)	88 episodes
1997	The Arrow	Crawford Gordon Jr.	4 episodes; also creative consultant
1997	Home Improvement	Reverend Mike Weber	Episode: "Losing My Religion"
1997–1998	Soul Man	Reverend Mike Weber	25 episodes
2000	Normal, Ohio	Frank Wozniak	Episode: "He Always Gets His Man"
2001	Earth vs. the Spider	Inspector Jack Grillo	Television film
2001	History's Mysteries	Narrator (voice)	Episode: "The Children's Crusade"
2002–2009	According to Jim	Sergeant Danny Michalski	5 episodes
2006	Living with Fran	Judge	Episode: "Going Crazy with Fran"
2009	Family Guy	Himself (voice)	Episode: "Spies Reminiscent of Us"
2011	The Defenders	Judge Max Hunter	2 episodes
2012	Happily Divorced	Harold	Episode: "Fran-alyze This"
2017–2023	Workin' Moms	Wayne Hoffman	4 episodes
2019	The Conners	Buddy	Episode: "The Preemie Monologues"
2019	The Movies That Made Us	Himself	Episode: "Ghostbusters"
2020–2021	Hotel Paranormal	Narrator (voice)	All episodes
2021	The Simpsons	Postage Stamp Fellow (voice)	Episode: "The Dad-Feelings Limited"
2023	The Unbelievable with Dan Aykroyd	Himself (host)	All episodes
2024	A History of the World in Six Glasses	Himself (host)	All episodes

=== Video games ===
Year	Title	Voice role	Notes
2009	Ghostbusters: The Video Game	Ray Stantz	Also writer
2010	Yogi Bear: The Video Game	Yogi Bear	
2015	Lego Dimensions	Ray Stantz	Archive sound
2019	Planet Coaster	Ray Stantz	
2019	Ghostbusters: The Video Game Remastered	Ray Stantz	Also writer
2022	Ghostbusters: Spirits Unleashed	Ray Stantz	
2023	Ghostbusters: Rise of the Ghost Lord	Ray Stantz	

=== Guest appearances on SNL ===
Date	Episode	Host / Musical guest	Role(s)
February 13, 1988	Season 13, Ep. 11	Justine Bateman, Terence Trent D'Arby	Bob Dole
May 15, 1993	Season 18, Ep. 20	Kevin Kline, Willie Nelson, Paul Simon	Bob Dole
March 25, 1995	Season 20, Ep. 16	John Goodman, The Tragically Hip	Bob Dole, Elwood Blues, Irwin Mainway, Tom Snyder, Rush Limbaugh, Robert Stack, Miner
February 7, 1998	Season 23, Ep. 14	John Goodman, Paula Cole	Bob Dole, Elwood Blues, Irwin Mainway, Ernesto
September 26, 1998	Season 24, Ep, 01	Cameron Diaz, The Smashing Pumpkins	Yortuk Festrunk
November 3, 2001	Season 27, Ep, 04	John Goodman, Ja Rule	Dr. Keith Vester, Elwood Blues, Leonard Pinth-Garnell
February 2, 2002	Season 27, Ep. 12	Britney Spears	Mormon, Judge Lindenwell
March 8, 2003	Season 28, Ep. 14	Queen Latifah, Ms. Dynamite	Bob Dole
May 17, 2003	Season 28, Ep. 20	Dan Aykroyd, Beyoncé	Andrew Card, Patrick Fitzpatrick, Esteban; Donnie "The Finger" Dabinski, Butch, Sam Elliott
March 24, 2007	Season 32, Ep. 16	Peyton Manning, Carrie Underwood	Himself
February 14, 2009	Season 34, Ep. 16	Alec Baldwin, The Jonas Brothers	John Boehner
March 9, 2013	Season 38, Ep. 16	Justin Timberlake	Himself, Yortuk Festrunk
February 15, 2015	Season 40	40th Anniversary Special	Super Bass-O-Matic 2150 Spokesperson, Elwood Blues

== Awards and nominations ==
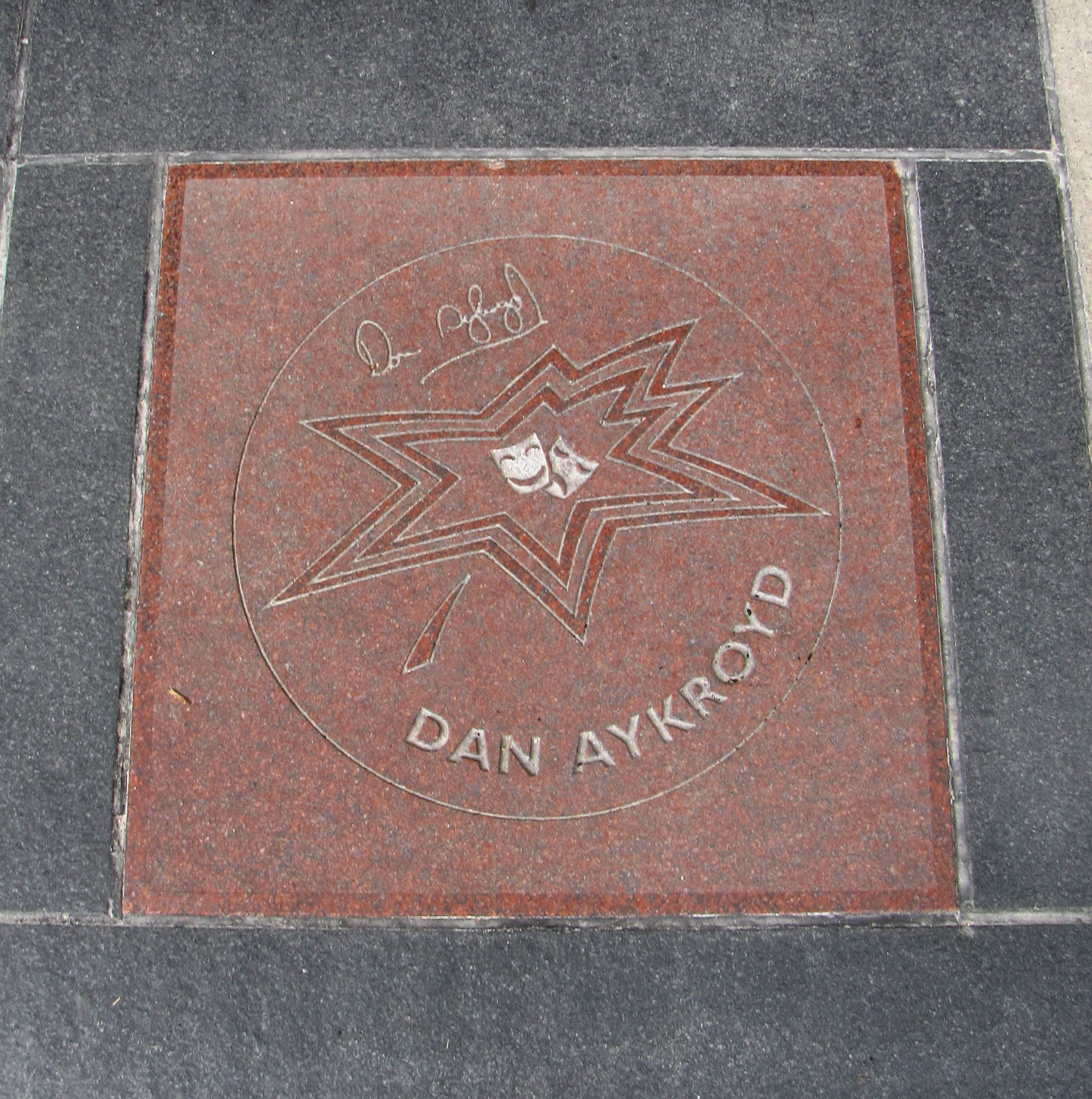
Aykroyd's star on Canada's Walk of Fame

In 1977, Aykroyd received an Emmy Award for Outstanding Writing in a Comedy-Variety or Music Series for his collaborative work on Saturday Night Live. In 1994, he received an honorary Doctor of Literature degree from Carleton University. In 1999, Aykroyd was made a Member of the Order of Canada. In 2002, he was inducted into Canada's Walk of Fame.

In 2017, he was made a member of the Order of Ontario in recognition for being "one of the world's most popular entertainers, well-known for his time on Saturday Night Live and the 1984 classic movie Ghostbusters."

Year	Nominated work	Accolade	Results	Ref
1977	Saturday Night Live	Primetime Emmy Award for Outstanding Writing in a Comedy-Variety or Music Series (shared with other writers)	Won	
1978	Saturday Night Live	Primetime Emmy Award for Outstanding Continuing or Single Performance by a Supporting Actor in a Variety or Music	Nominated	
1978	Saturday Night Live	Primetime Emmy Award for Outstanding Writing in a Comedy-Variety or Music Series (shared with other writers)	Nominated	
1979	Saturday Night Live	Primetime Emmy Award for Outstanding Comedy-Variety or Music Program	Nominated	
1979	Saturday Night Live	Primetime Emmy Award for Outstanding Writing in a Comedy or Comedy-Variety or Music Series (shared with other writers)	Nominated	
1985	Ghostbusters	Hugo Award for Best Dramatic Presentation	Nominated	
1987	The Best of Dan Aykroyd	American Comedy Award for Funniest Record And/Or Video - Male, Female or Group	Nominated	
1989	Caddyshack II	Golden Raspberry Award for Worst Supporting Actor	Won	
1990	Driving Miss Daisy	Academy Award for Best Supporting Actor	Nominated	
1990	Driving Miss Daisy	American Comedy Award for Funniest Supporting Actor in a Motion Picture	Nominated	
1992	Nothing But Trouble	Golden Raspberry Award for Worst Director	Nominated	
1992	Nothing But Trouble	Golden Raspberry Award for Worst Screenplay (shared with Peter Aykroyd)	Nominated	
1992	Nothing But Trouble	Golden Raspberry Award for Worst Supporting Actor	Won	
1995	Exit to Eden; North	Golden Raspberry Award for Worst Supporting Actor	Nominated	
1995	Exit to Eden; North	Golden Raspberry Award for Worst Screen Couple (shared with Rosie O'Donnell)	Nominated	
2002	Crossroads	The Stinkers Bad Movie Award for Worst Fake Accent: Male	Nominated	
2007	Saturday Night Live	TV Land Award for Favorite Elvis Impersonation (shared with John Belushi)	Nominated	
2018	Workin' Moms	Canadian Screen Award for Best Supporting or Guest Actor, Comedy	Nominated	
2020	Workin' Moms	Canadian Screen Award for Best Guest Performance, Comedy	Nominated	

== See also ==
- List of American actors
- List of Canadian actors
- List of celebrities who own wineries and vineyards
- List of Saturday Night Live cast members

Preceded by Jane Curtin solo	Weekend Update anchor 1977–1978	Succeeded by Jane Curtin with Bill Murray
Preceded by Position inaugurated	MTV Video Music Awards host 1984 (co-host with Bette Midler)	Succeeded by Eddie Murphy
