= Joseph Karwowski =

Russia-born inventor

Joseph Karwowski was a Russia-born inventor, known for his corpse preservation invention.

== Career ==
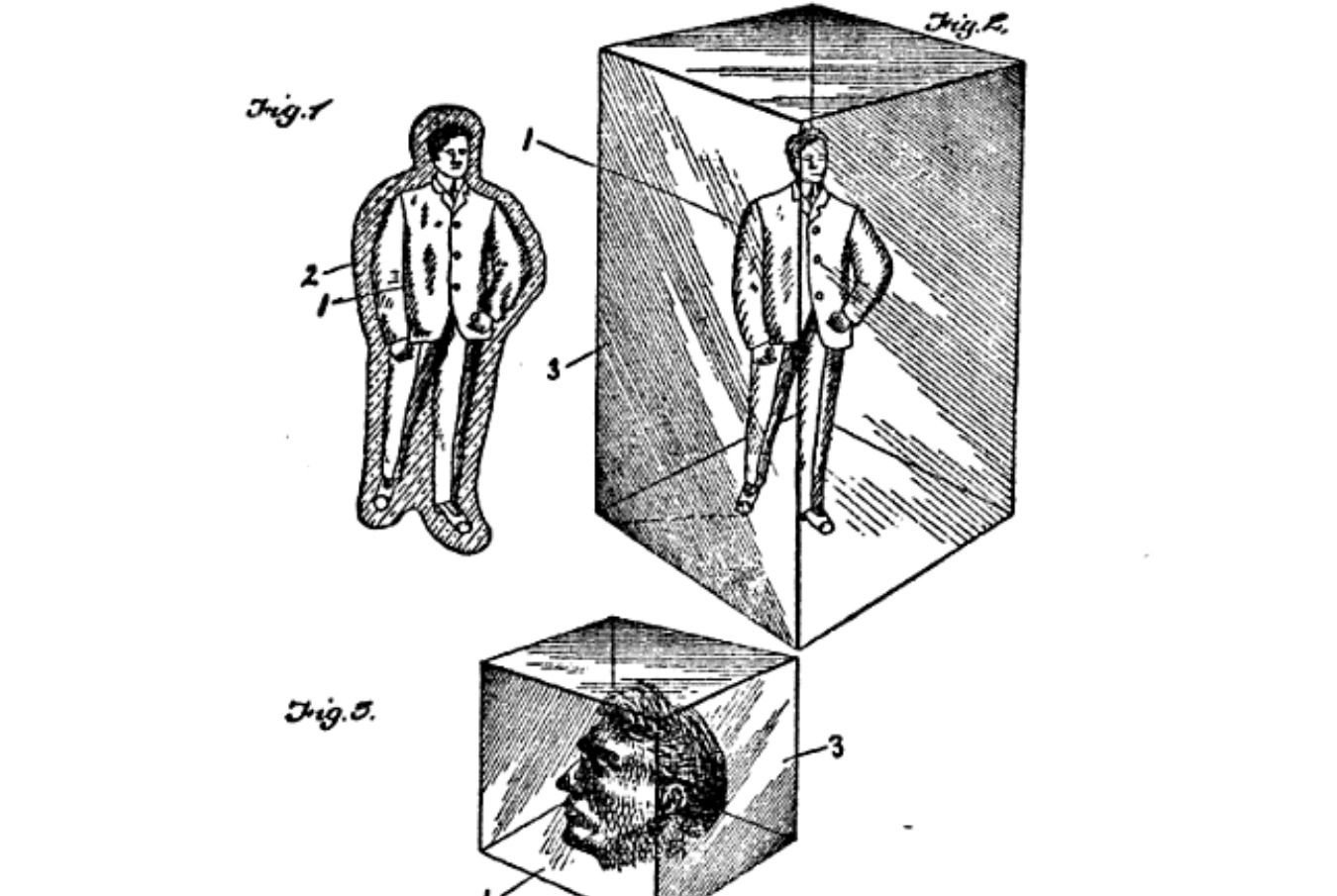
Drawings by Karwowski showing the glass coffin in detail.

Born in Russia, Karwowski immigrated to the United States and was based in Herkimer, New York. He obtained US Patent Number 748,284 in 1903 for his Solid Glass "Coffin" designed to preserve dead bodies for as long as intended. According to his application for the patent, addressed to the United States Patent Office, the coffin, which is actually a transparent tank made of glass, is capable of storing either the whole corpse or just the head. He specified that the coffin would be air-tight.

== Legacy ==
A fact concerning Karwowski's dead body-preserving invention appeared on the June 29, 2013 Ripley's Believe it or Not! comic strip by John Graziano.
