= Crystal Head Vodka =

Canadian vodka brand

- Crystal Head Vodka
- Type: Vodka
- Manufacturer: Globefill Inc.
- Origin: Canada
- Introduced: Southern California, 2008
- Alcohol by volume: 40%
- Proof (US): 80
- Colour: Colourless
- Variants: Original; Aurora; Onyx
- Website: crystalheadvodka.com

Crystal Head Vodka is a brand of vodkas manufactured by Globefill Inc. in Newfoundland and Labrador, Canada. It was conceived and founded by actor Dan Aykroyd and artist John Alexander in September 2008. The vodkas are quadruple-distilled, filtered seven times and packaged in a glass bottle modeled after a crystal skull.

== History ==
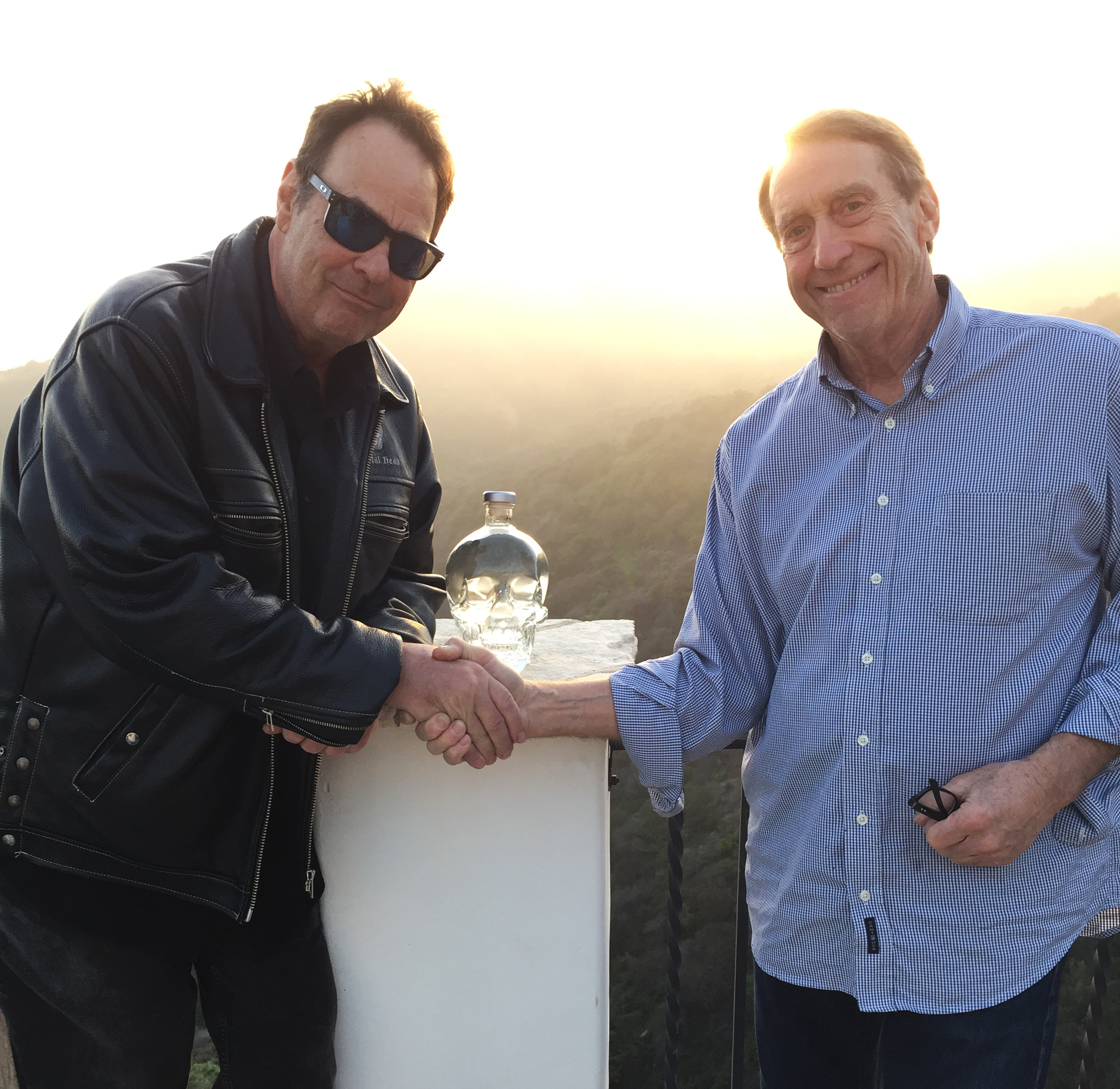
Dan Aykroyd and John Alexander

Actor Dan Aykroyd and artist John Alexander conceived Crystal Head Vodka in 2008. Due to the lack of additive-free vodka on the market, Aykroyd decided to make one himself. Alexander designed the bottle based on the pair's shared fascination with the legend of the thirteen crystal skulls.

In 2010, the Liquor Control Board of Ontario refused to carry Crystal Head Vodka in its stores, saying that people might find the bottle offensive. They reversed their decision after a change was made to the box design.

In May 2011, 21,000 bottles of the vodka were stolen from a warehouse in Southern California. Aykroyd joked that he was "happy that some consumers will be afforded the opportunity of tasting it at significantly lower than retail price".

As of 2013, Aykroyd was spending over 90 days a year on the road promoting the vodka through signings and appearances. The brand was the official vodka of the Rolling Stones' 50th Anniversary Tour in 2013.

In 2014, forensic artist Nigel Cockerton used clay to make a muscle, skin and hair construction on one of the skull bottles to see what it would look like if the bottle had been an actual person. The result resembled a laughing man. Dan Aykroyd was pleased with the face, although he had previously thought of the bottle as being feminine due to its size, and had nicknamed the bottle Joy due to the joy it brought him. He joked that he was relieved that the face didn't turn out to look like him.

== Production ==
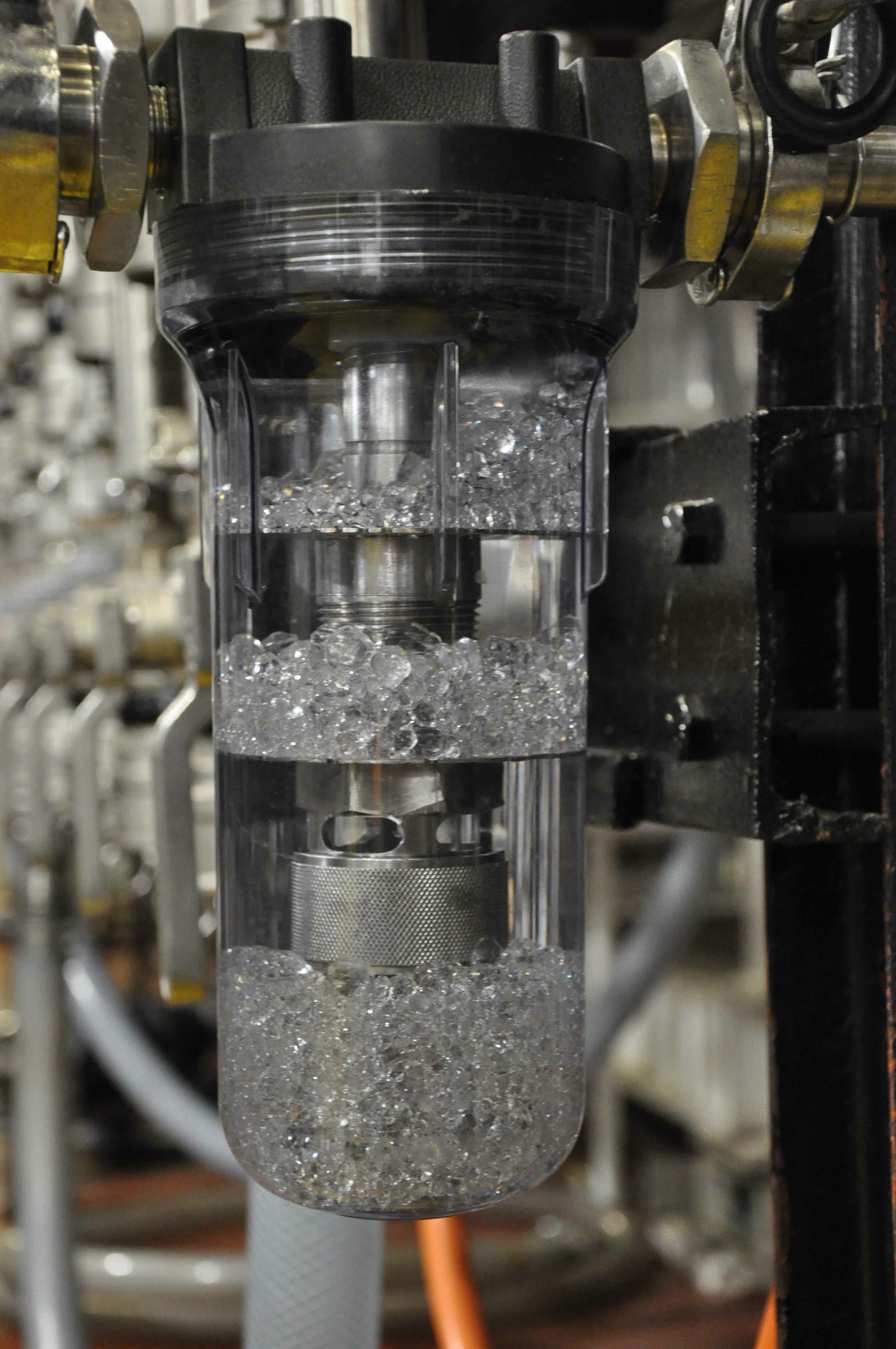
The three quartz filters used in Crystal Head Vodka's filtering process

Crystal Head Vodka is manufactured by Globefill Incorporated at the Newfoundland and Labrador Liquor Corporation distillery called Rock Spirits in Newfoundland and Labrador, Canada. Ontario sweet corn grown in the Chatham-Kent region of Ontario is processed and distilled four times, but not aged, to produce a neutral grain spirit at 95% alcohol by volume. The raw spirit is then reduced with Newfoundland water to 40% alcohol by volume. The liquid is then filtered seven times with the final three filtrations through Herkimer diamond crystals, which are actually a type of double-terminated quartz rather than diamond. Crystal Head does not use any additives in the production of their vodka. The factory and product is certified kosher as well as gluten-free.
