= Rock Spirits =

- Type: Crown Corporation
- Industry: Co-Packing, Product Manufacturer
- Founded: St. John's, Newfoundland and Labrador (1954)
- Headquarters: St. John's, Newfoundland and Labrador, Canada
- Key people: Wally Dicks, VP Supply Chain Management
- Products: Alcoholic beverages, rum, vodka, spirits, gin, whisky
- Revenue: $264,100,000 CAD
- Number of employees: 50
- Website: www.rockspirits.ca

Rock Spirits is the manufacturing division of the Newfoundland and Labrador Liquor Corporation, a provincial crown corporation of the Canadian province of Newfoundland and Labrador. It is the only remaining Canadian Liquor Board to have a manufacturing division. It has been in operation in St. John's for over 65 years.

Rock Spirits ships products to all the Canadian Liquor Boards, across the United States and over 30 countries in four continents, with production of almost 400,000 cases a year on five packaging lines.

Rock Spirits owns 15 of its own brands, including its iconic Screech Rum. Some of the partner brands bottled at Rock Spirits include Crystal Head Vodka, Iceberg Vodka, Golden Wedding and Liquormen’s Ol’ Dirty Canadian Whisky.
