= John Alexander (artist) =

American painter (born 1945)

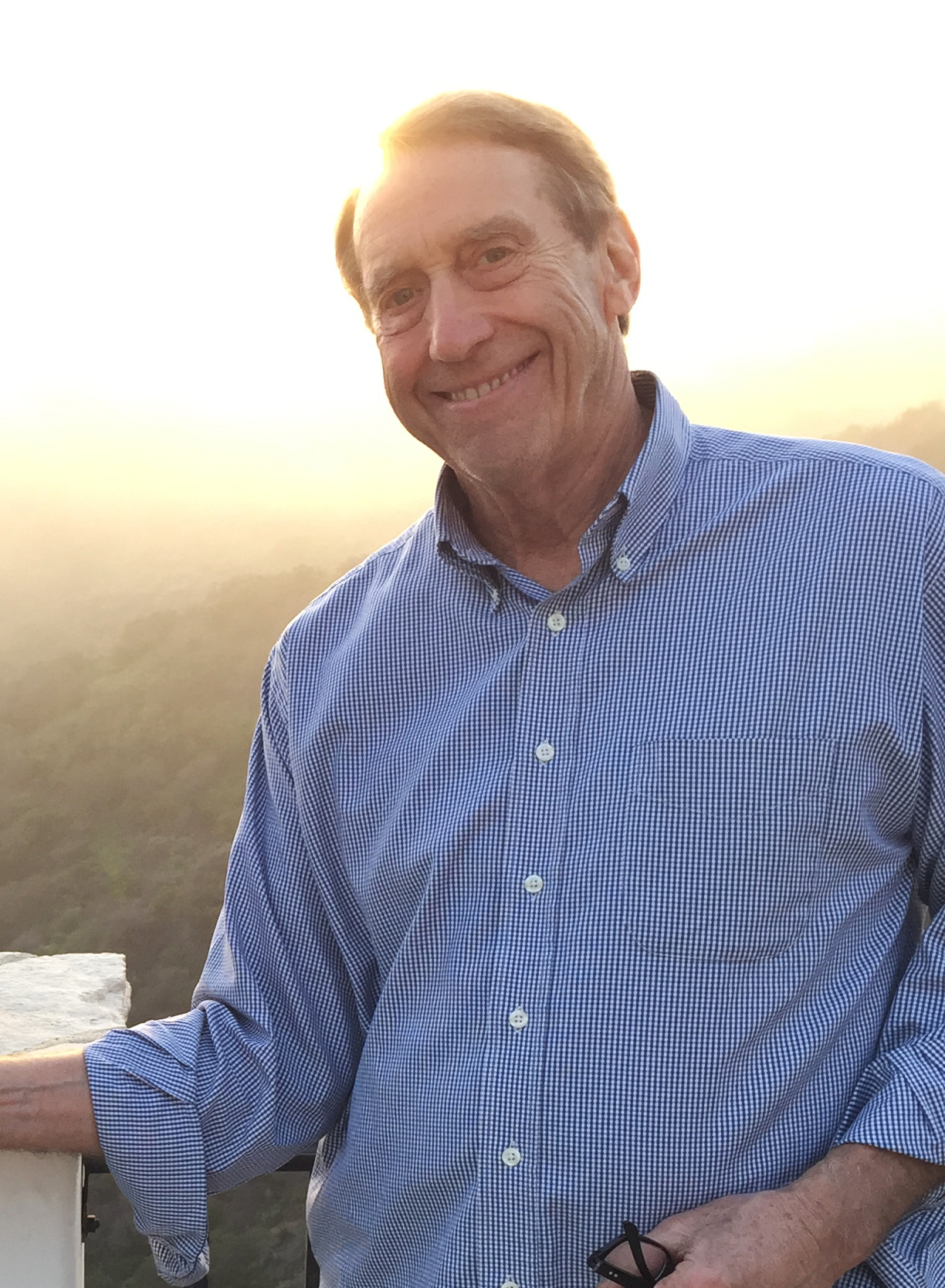
- Alexander in 2017
- Born: October 26, 1945 (age 80); Beaumont, Texas, U.S.
- Website: johnalexanderstudios.com

John Alexander (born October 26, 1945) is an American painter. Alexander studied art at Lamar University in Beaumont and Southern Methodist University in Dallas. After teaching at the University of Houston from 1971 to 1978, he moved to New York.

Alexander’s work is influenced by his affection for the southern landscape. A painting called Lost Souls depicts Alexander’s cast of characters, including various masked politicians, religious figures, skeletons, monkeys, and creatures adrift in stormy waters. Alexander’s work ranges from the beautiful to the macabre. His thick paint and forceful linework is often the unifying trait throughout his work. Alexander is the creator of the Crystal Head Vodka skull bottle, and he is a co-owner of the company with actor and comedian Dan Aykroyd.

== Exhibitions ==
Alexander’s work can be found in the permanent collections of a number of museums, including the Corcoran Gallery of Art, Washington DC; the Dallas Museum of Art, Dallas; Hirshhorn Museum, DC; Los Angeles County Museum of Art, Los Angeles; the Meadows Museum, Dallas; The Metropolitan Museum of Art, New York; Museum of Contemporary Art, Los Angeles; Museum of Fine Arts, Houston; the Art Museum of Southeast Texas, Beaumont, Texas; New Orleans Museum of Art, New Orleans; Ogden Museum of Southern Art, New Orleans; and the Smithsonian American Art Museum, Washington, D.C., as well as other public and private collections worldwide.

In 2007–2008, the Smithsonian American Art Museum displayed John Alexander: A Retrospective featuring works from works made over three decades.

Alexander was a 2012 recipient of the Guild Hall Lifetime Achievement Award
