= Newfoundland and Labrador Liquor Corporation =

- Type: Crown Corporation
- Industry: Beverages
- Founded: St. John's, Newfoundland and Labrador (1954)
- Headquarters: St. John's, Newfoundland and Labrador, Canada
- Key people: Bruce Keating, President and CEO
- Products: Alcohol, Beer, Wine, Spirits, Ciders
- Revenue: $264,100,000 CAD
- Number of employees: 637
- Website: www.nlliquor.com

The Newfoundland and Labrador Liquor Corporation is a provincial crown corporation of the Canadian province of Newfoundland and Labrador. It is responsible for managing the importation, sale and distribution of beverage alcohol and recreational cannabis within the province. The name is officially abbreviated NLC, although "Labrador" was added to the official full company name after the abbreviation was established.

The Corporation's headquarters is on Kenmount Road in St. John's. It operates 28 retail stores and one distribution centre, and also licences and services over 140 agency stores in the smaller communities.

Each year, NLC engages in the manufacture of alcoholic beverages through its co-packing division Rock Spirits, blending and bottling over 350,000 cases of spirits.

Products blended and bottled by the Corporation include dark rums (including Newfoundland Screech), amber rum, gin, brandy, two Canadian whiskies and two vodkas including Iceberg Vodka and Crystal Head Vodka brands. Much of this product, especially Screech and Iceberg Vodka, is manufactured for export and thus provides an additional source of revenue for the provincial government.

NLC also operates in partnership with the provincial Government Services Centre and enforcement agencies to ensure compliance with the Acts and Regulations pertaining to the sale, transportation and distribution of beverage alcohol within the province. These Acts and Regulations include the Liquor Corporation Act, the Liquor Control Act and Liquor Licensing Regulations.
