= Herkimer, New York =

- Town
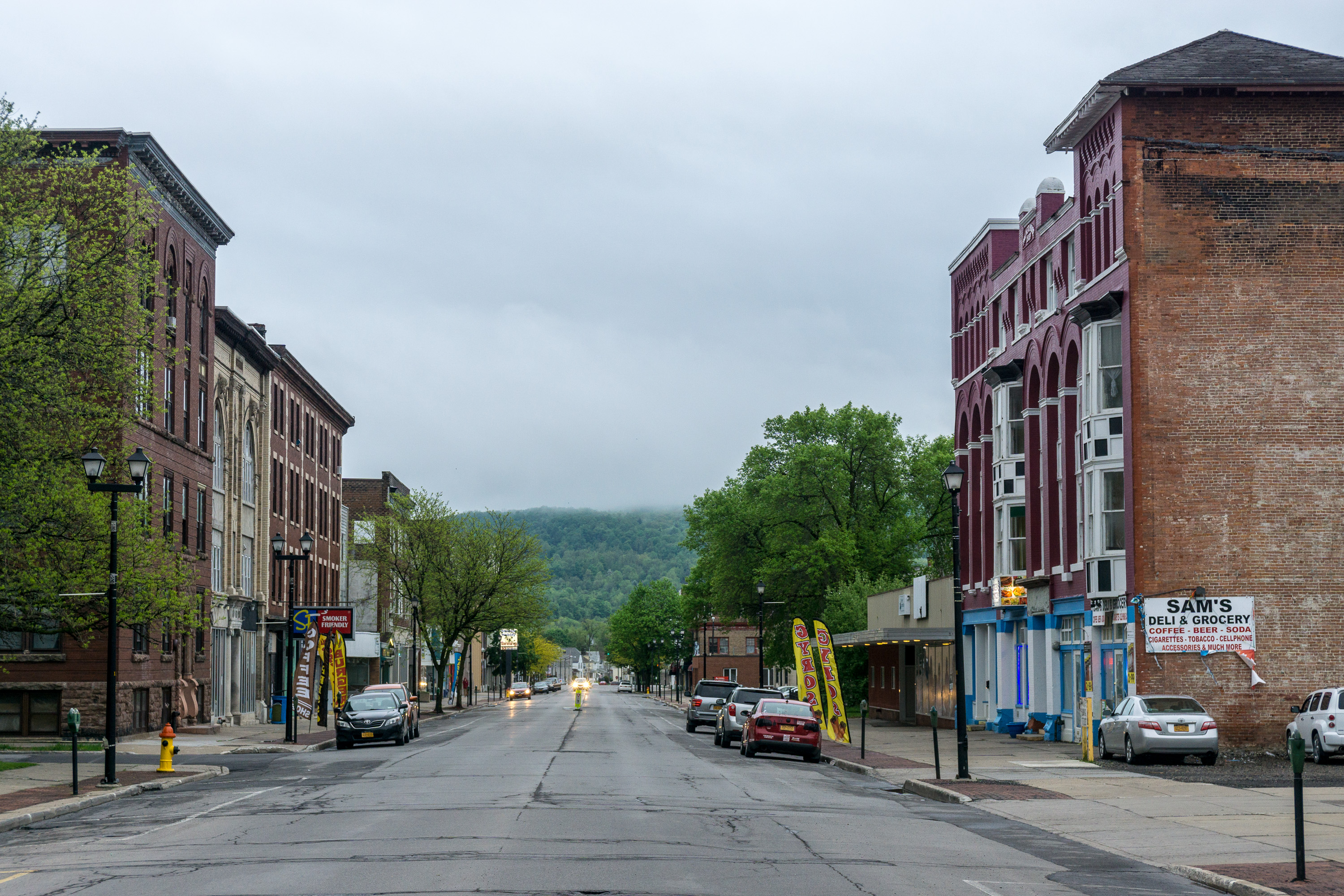
- North Main Street

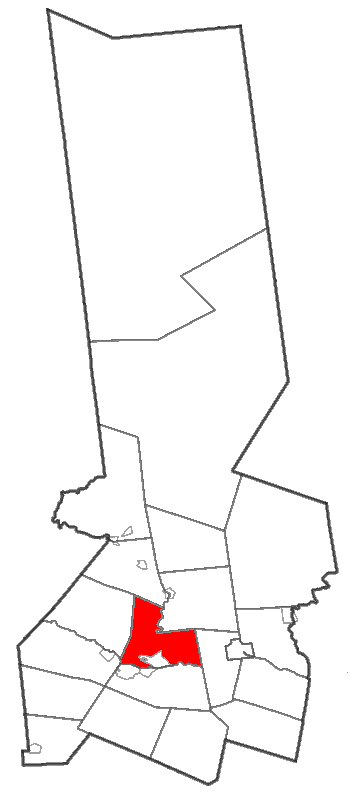
- Location of Herkimer within Herkimer County

- Location within New York Location within the United States
- Coordinates: 43°1′34″N 74°59′25″W
- Country: United States
- State: New York
- County: Herkimer

Government
  - Mayor: Dominic J. Frank (R) Town Council: Daniel D. Staltieri (R); Randy A. Kast (R); Vito F. Carbone (R); Craig N. Gros (R)

Area
  - Total: 32.23 sq mi (83.47 km^{2})
  - Land: 31.66 sq mi (82.00 km^{2})
  - Water: 0.57 sq mi (1.47 km^{2})

Population (2020)
  - Total: 9,566
- Time zone: EST
  - Summer (DST): EDT
- ZIP Codes: 13350 (Herkimer); 13340 (Frankfort); 13365 (Little Falls)
- Area code: 315
- FIPS code: 36-043-34132
- Website: townofherkimer.org

Herkimer is a town in Herkimer County, New York, United States, southeast of Utica. It is named after Nicholas Herkimer. The population was 9,566 at the 2020 census, down from 10,175 in 2010.

The town contains a village also called Herkimer. Herkimer County Community College is located in Herkimer village.

== History ==
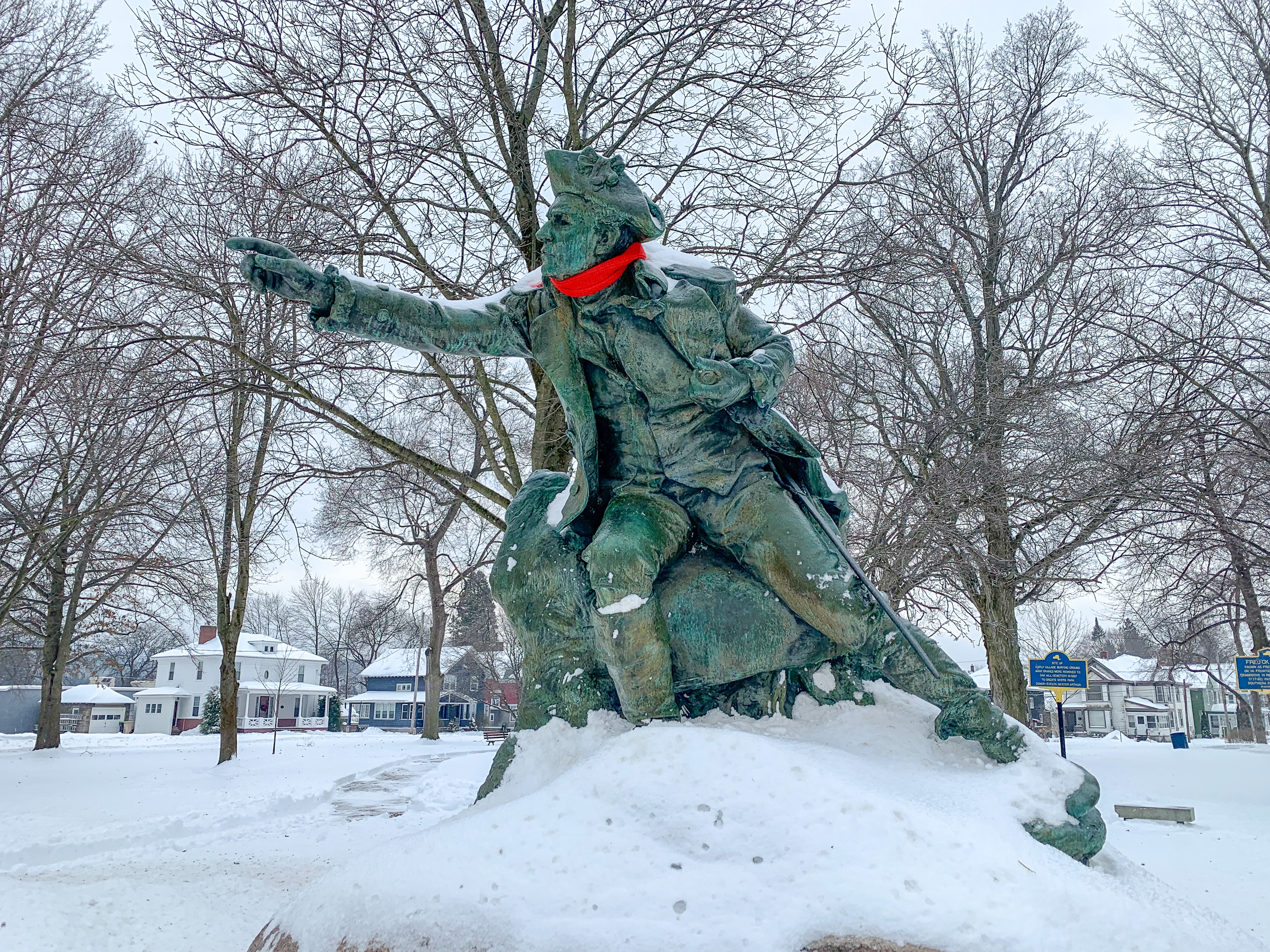
Statue of Nicholas Herkimer in Myers Park

Herkimer was first settled c. 1722, in an area originally called "Stone Ridge", now the village of Herkimer. Early settlers were primarily German Palatines.

Johan Jost Herchheimer, a farmer who also engaged in trade and transport on the Mohawk River, settled in the German Flatts District of Albany County in 1725, on the south side of the Mohawk River, within the present-day town of German Flatts, incorporated in 1788. He owned 5,000 acres (20 km^{2}) of the land, including a strategic portage around Little Falls on the Mohawk, where his eldest son Nicholas Herkimer established a farmstead. In 1788, the town of Herkimer, on the north side of the river, was incorporated and named after him.

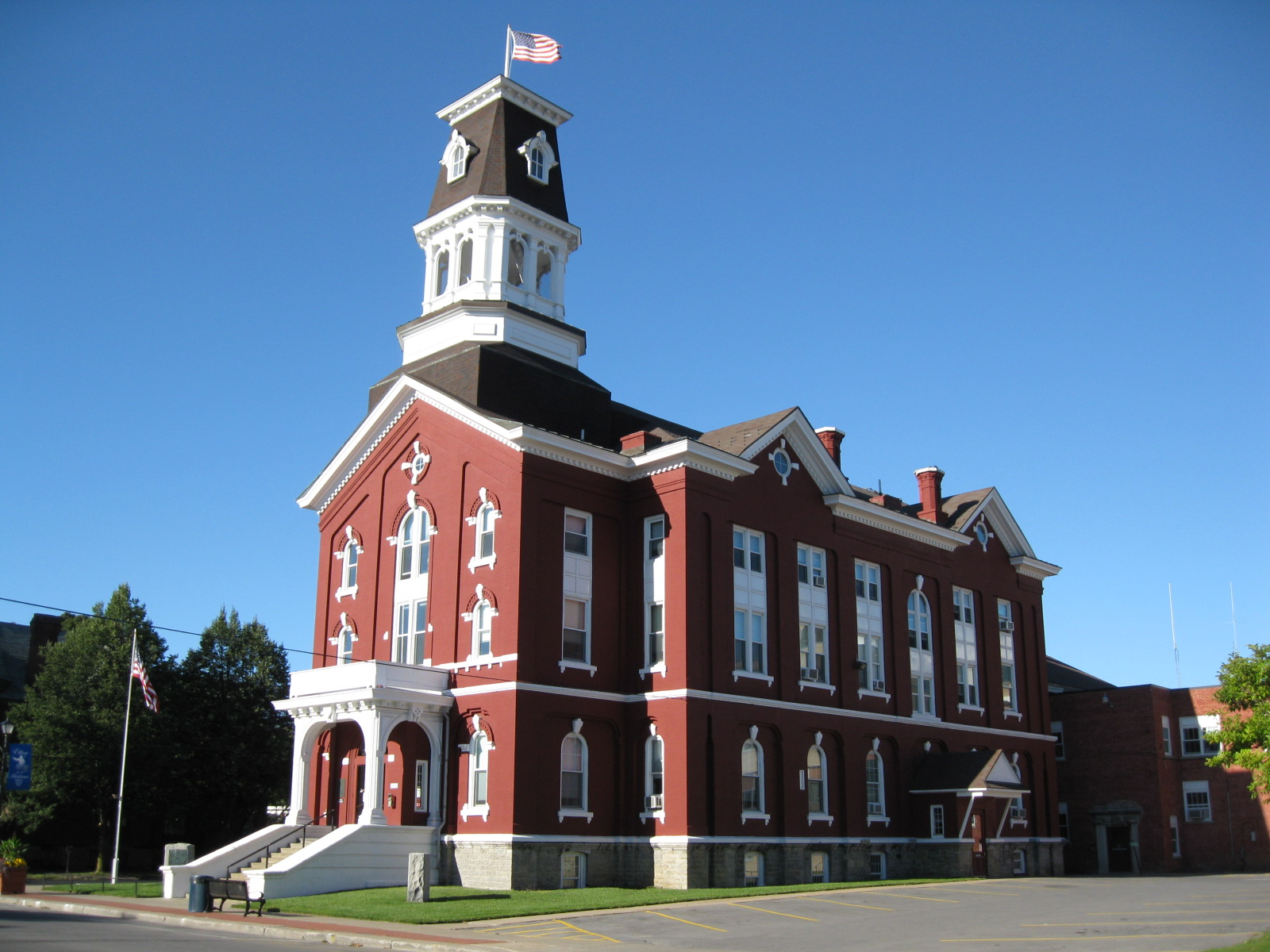
Herkimer County Courthouse

During the French and Indian War, the Mohawk Valley was ravaged by raids of the French and their native allies. By 1770, Nicholas had established great wealth through farming and trade during the wars, and had also gained military experience as a captain of a militia. He would later fight in the Battle of Oriskany.

In 1906, the murder trial of Chester Gillette brought many spectators to the county courthouse in Herkimer village.

The Herkimer County shootings took place partially in Herkimer on March 13, 2013.

== Geography ==
According to the United States Census Bureau, the town has a total area of 32.2 square miles (83.5 km^{2}). Land comprises 31.7 square miles (82.0 km^{2}) of the town, and 0.58 square miles (1.5 km^{2}) of the town (1.76%) are water.

West Canada Creek empties into the Mohawk River by Herkimer village. On the opposite shore of the Mohawk River are the villages of Mohawk and Ilion.

The New York State Thruway and New York State Route 5 run through the southwestern part of the town. New York State Route 28 is a north–south highway that intersects NY-5 in Herkimer village.

== Demographics ==
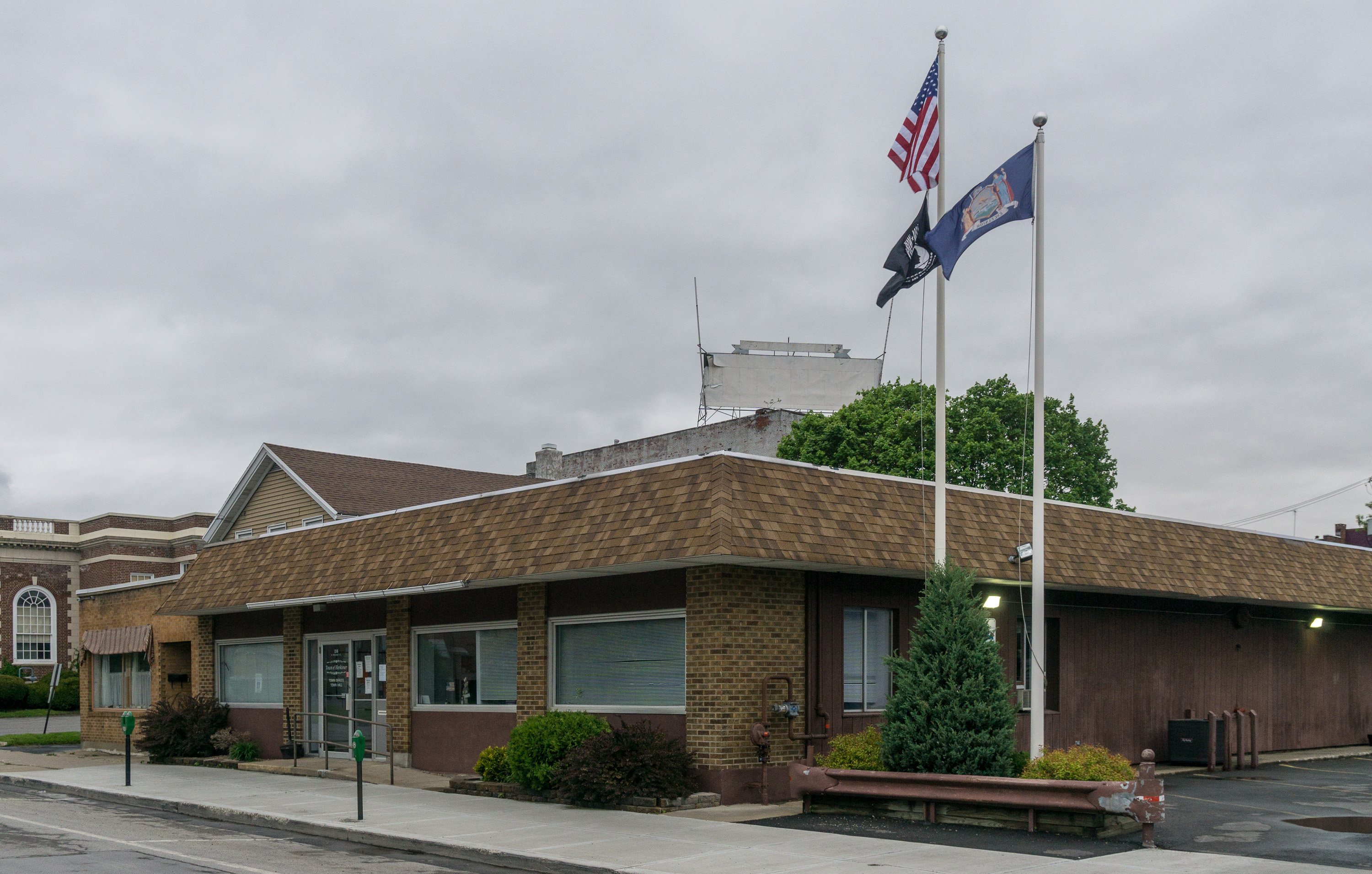
Herkimer Town Hall and Town Offices. 114 N. Prospect St.

Historical population
Census	Pop.	Note	%±
1790	1,525		—
1820	3,055		—
1830	2,486		−18.6%
1840	2,369		−4.7%
1850	2,601		9.8%
1860	2,804		7.8%
1870	2,949		5.2%
1880	3,593		21.8%
1890	4,666		29.9%
1900	6,748		44.6%
1910	8,797		30.4%
1920	11,982		36.2%
1930	12,327		2.9%
1940	11,345		−8.0%
1950	11,235		−1.0%
1960	11,568		3.0%
1970	11,451		−1.0%
1980	11,027		−3.7%
1990	10,401		−5.7%
2000	9,961		−4.2%
2010	10,175		2.1%
2020	9,566		−6.0%
U.S. Decennial Census

As of the census of 2000, there were 9,962 people, 4,114 households, and 2,386 families residing in the town. The population density was 315.6 inhabitants per square mile (121.9/km^{2}). There were 4,513 housing units at an average density of 143.0 per square mile (55.2/km^{2}). The racial makeup of the town was 96.83% White, 0.97% Black or African American, 0.18% Native American, 1.03% Asian, 0.01% Pacific Islander, 0.41% from other races, and 0.56% from two or more races. Hispanic or Latino of any race were 1.17% of the population.

There were 4,114 households, out of which 25.3% had children under the age of 18 living with them, 42.8% were married couples living together, 10.7% had a female householder with no husband present, and 42.0% were non-families. 32.0% of all households were made up of individuals, and 16.5% had someone living alone who was 65 years of age or older. The average household size was 2.29 and the average family size was 2.90.

In the town, the population was spread out, with 20.2% under the age of 18, 12.9% from 18 to 24, 23.0% from 25 to 44, 22.2% from 45 to 64, and 21.8% who were 65 years of age or older. The median age was 40 years. For every 100 females, there were 89.5 males. For every 100 females age 18 and over, there were 87.1 males.

The median income for a household in the town was $28,763, and the median income for a family was $42,296. Males had a median income of $30,828 versus $20,845 for females. The per capita income for the town was $17,211. About 7.9% of families and 13.3% of the population were below the poverty line, including 8.9% of those under age 18 and 10.9% of those age 65 or over.

== Communities and locations in the Town of Herkimer ==
- Beacon Light Corners – A location near the western town line.
- East Herkimer – A hamlet east of Herkimer village on NY-5.
- Eatonville – A hamlet near the northeastern corner of the town.
- Hasenclever Hill – An elevation located north of Herkimer.
- Herkimer – The village of Herkimer is by the southern town line, on NY-5 by the Mohawk River.
- Kast Bridge – A hamlet north of Herkimer village on NY-28.
- Mirror Lake – A small lake north of Herkimer village.
- Oak Hill – An elevation located northwest of Herkimer. Located partially in the Town of Schuyler.
- Osborne Hill – An elevation located northwest of Herkimer. Located partially in the Town of Schuyler.
- Schrader Hill – An elevation located north of Herkimer; partially in the Town of Newport.
- Steuben Hill – An elevation located northwest of Herkimer.
