= Newfoundland Screech =

Canadian alcoholic drink

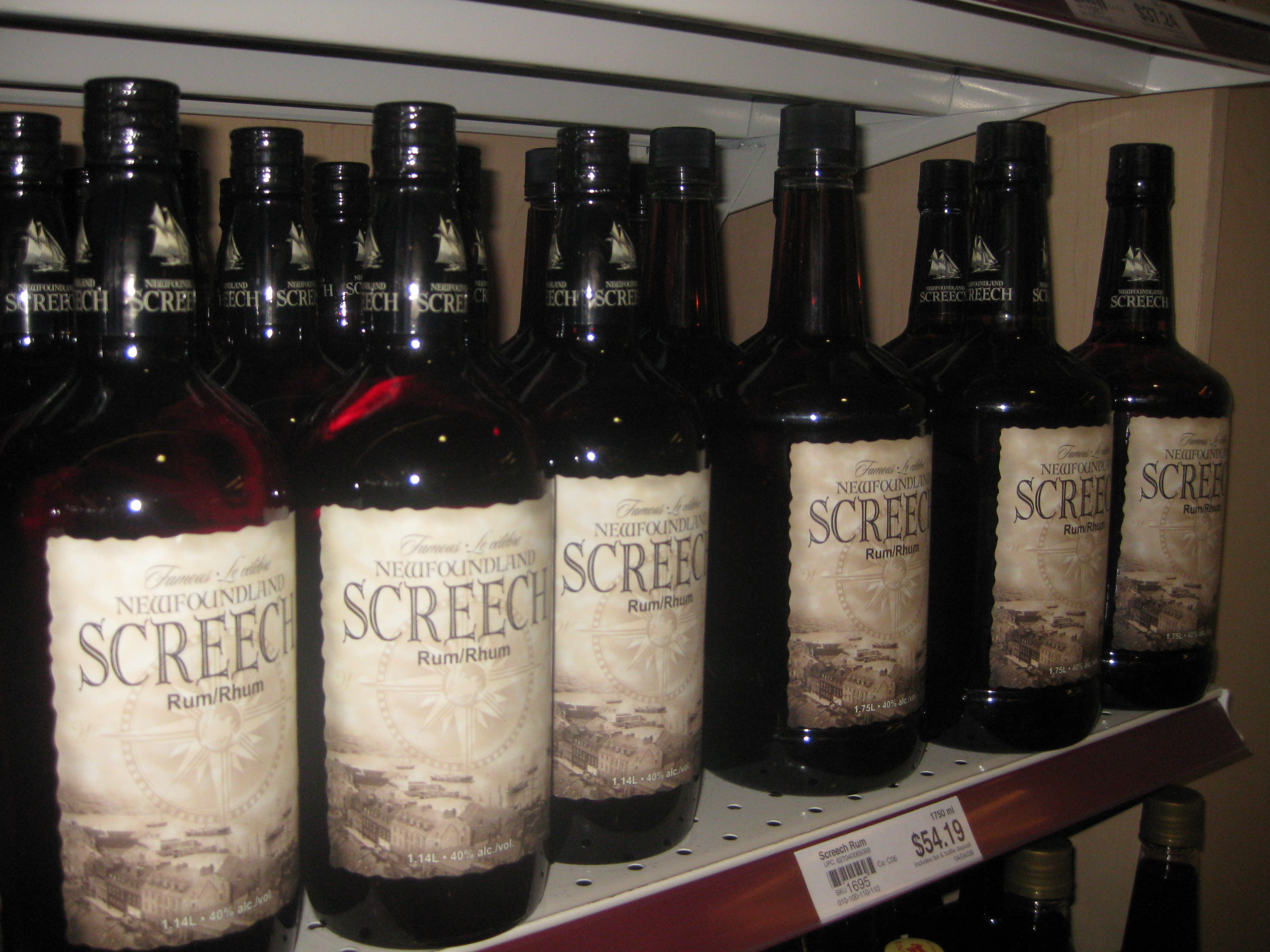
Screech

Newfoundland Screech is a rum sold in Newfoundland with 40% alcohol by volume. The term screech is a colloquial term that has been used to describe almost any cheap, high alcohol spirit, including moonshine. The term is used in the brand name for this mid-priced rum to associate the brand with this tradition.

It is available in liquor stores both in and outside of Newfoundland and is blended and bottled by the Newfoundland and Labrador Liquor Corporation, after being imported from Jamaica. Unlike its counterparts in other provinces, NLC has retained its bottling business. The spirit is widely available in Canada and is also distributed in New England.

== Screech-in ==
Newfoundland Screech is used in a ceremony known as the "screech-in". The "screech-in" is a ceremony performed on non-Newfoundlanders (known to Newfoundlanders as a "come from away" or "mainlander") involving a shot of screech, a short recitation, and the kissing of a cod. It is often performed either in homes or more commonly in town pubs, such as those on George Street, St. John's. Notable for their screech-in traditions are Trapper John's, O'Reilly's Irish Newfoundland Pub and Christian's Bar. Screech-ins also take place aboard tourist boat excursions, like the Scademia, which has been used to operate the first boat tour business in Newfoundland. Such a ceremony can include sailing through The Narrows into St. John's harbour.

The general process of a screech-in varies from pub to pub and community to community, though it often begins with the leader of the ceremony introducing themselves and asking those present if they'd like to become a Newfoundlander. The proper response is a hearty "Yes b'y!" Each participant is asked to introduce themselves and where they come from, often interrupted by commentary by the ceremony leader, jokingly poking fun at their accent or hometown. Each holding their shot of Screech, they are then asked "Are ye a screecher?" or "Is you a Newfoundlander?," and are taught the proper response: "Indeed I is, me ol' cock! And long may yer big jib draw!" Translated, it means "Yes I am, my old friend, and may your sails always catch wind."

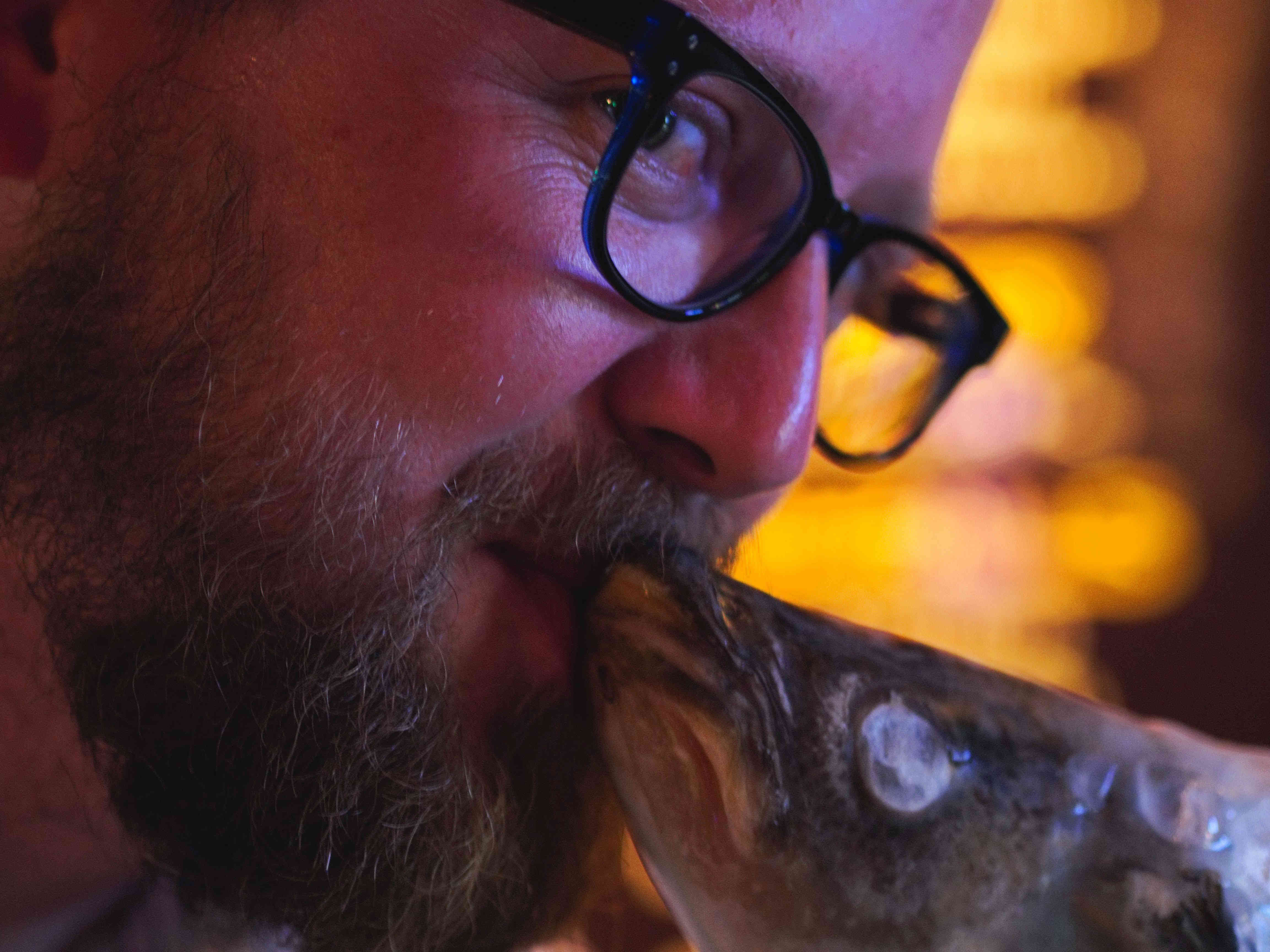
A man kissing a cod during a screech-in ceremony

A codfish – or any other fish unsightly enough to suitably replace the cod – is then held up to the lip level of each participant, who then bestows the fish with a kiss. Frozen fish is used most commonly in the screech-ins which take place on George St., though occasionally a fresher fish will be used if available. Some pubs will also award certificates to those who have become an honorary Newfie once the screech-in is complete.

Some screech-in traditions vary in both the order of events as well as the requirements. Some ceremonies require that the screech-ee eat a piece of "Newfie steak" (a slice of baloney) or kiss a rubber puffin's rear end. Some are also asked to stand in a bucket of saltwater throughout the ceremony or that they wear the Sou'wester during the recitation and the drinking of the shot. For group screech-ins, the shots and recitations are generally all done at once. In all cases, only a native Newfoundlander can officiate at a "proper" screech-in.
