= Little Falls Formation =

Geologic formation

- Stratigraphic range: Cambrian
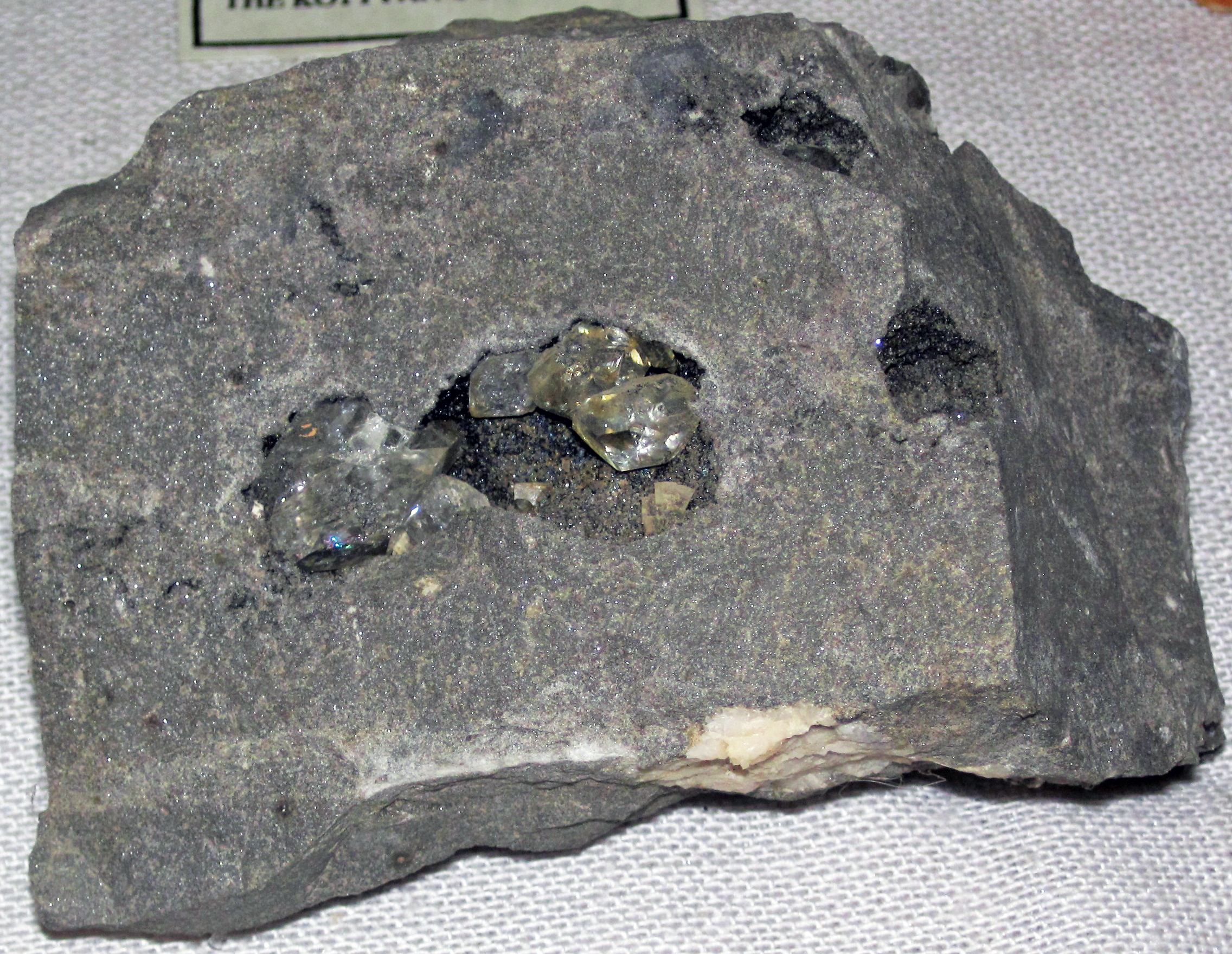
- Herkimer diamond quartz in dolostone (Little Falls Formation; Middleville, New York State)
- Type: Formation
- Overlies: Proterozoic gneiss

Lithology
- Primary: dolomite
- Other: sandstone

Location
- Region: New York
- Country: United States

The Little Falls Formation or Little Falls Dolostone is a geologic formation in New York. The unit is of Cambrian age and rests unconformably on Precambrian rock. The unit is noted as the host for the Herkimer diamonds of New York. The unit contains stromatolites and rare brachiopod fossils.

== See also ==
- List of fossiliferous stratigraphic units in New York
