= Herkimer diamond =

Quartz crystals found in the Herkimer county of New York

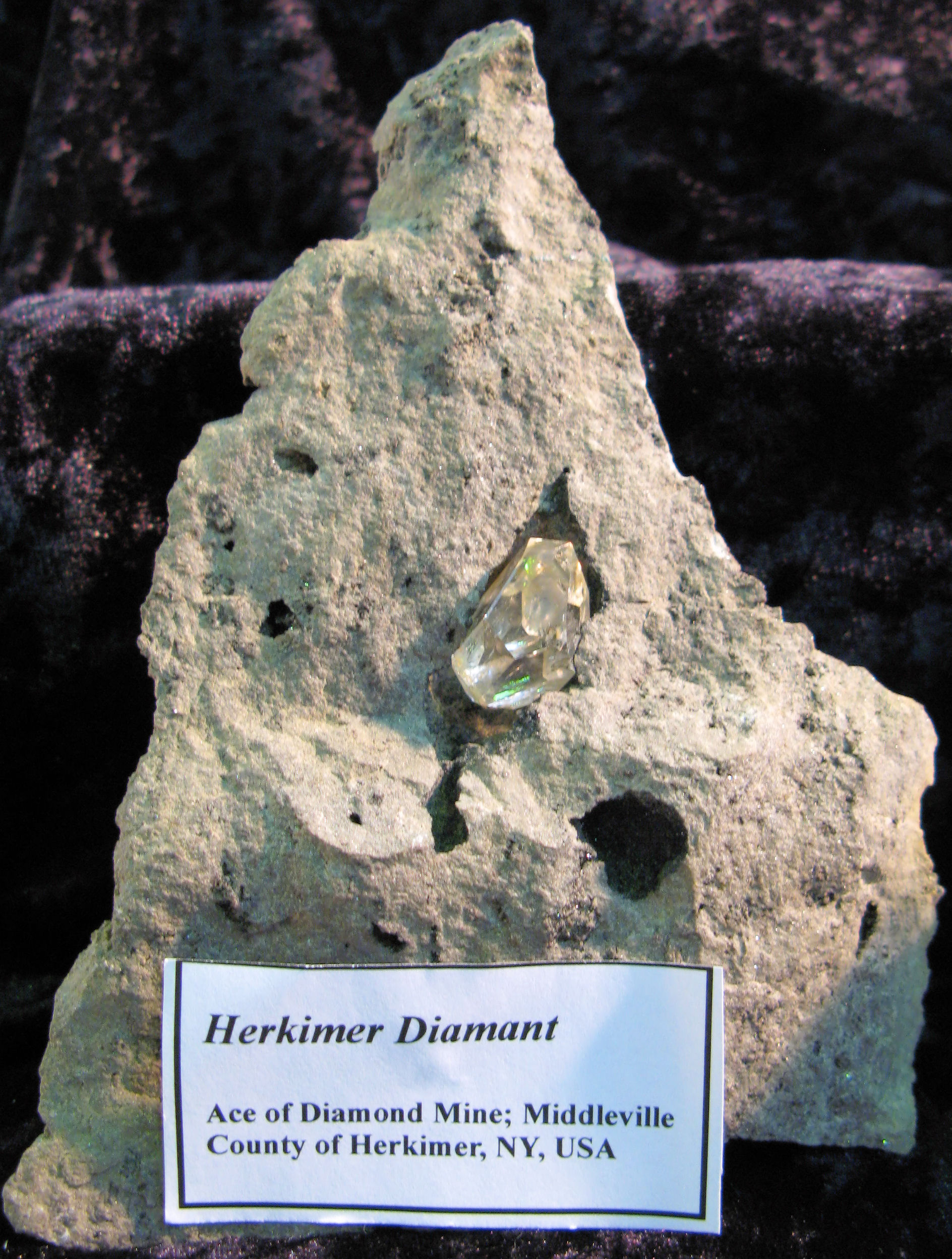
"Herkimer Diamant" - Middleville, County of Herkimer, New York, US

Herkimer diamonds are double-terminated quartz crystals discovered within exposed outcrops of dolomite in and around Herkimer County, New York, and the Mohawk River Valley in the US. They are not diamonds; the "diamond" in their name is due to both their clarity and well-formed faces. Because the first discovery sites were in the village of Middleville and in the city of Little Falls, respectively, the crystal is also known as a Middleville diamond or a Little Falls diamond.

Herkimer diamonds became widely recognized after workmen discovered them in large quantities while cutting into the Mohawk River Valley dolomite in the late 18th century. Geologists discovered exposed dolomite in Herkimer County outcroppings and began mining there, leading to the "Herkimer diamond" moniker. Double-terminated quartz crystals can be found around the world, but are often labeled "Herkimer diamonds" regardless of origin.

== Process of formation ==
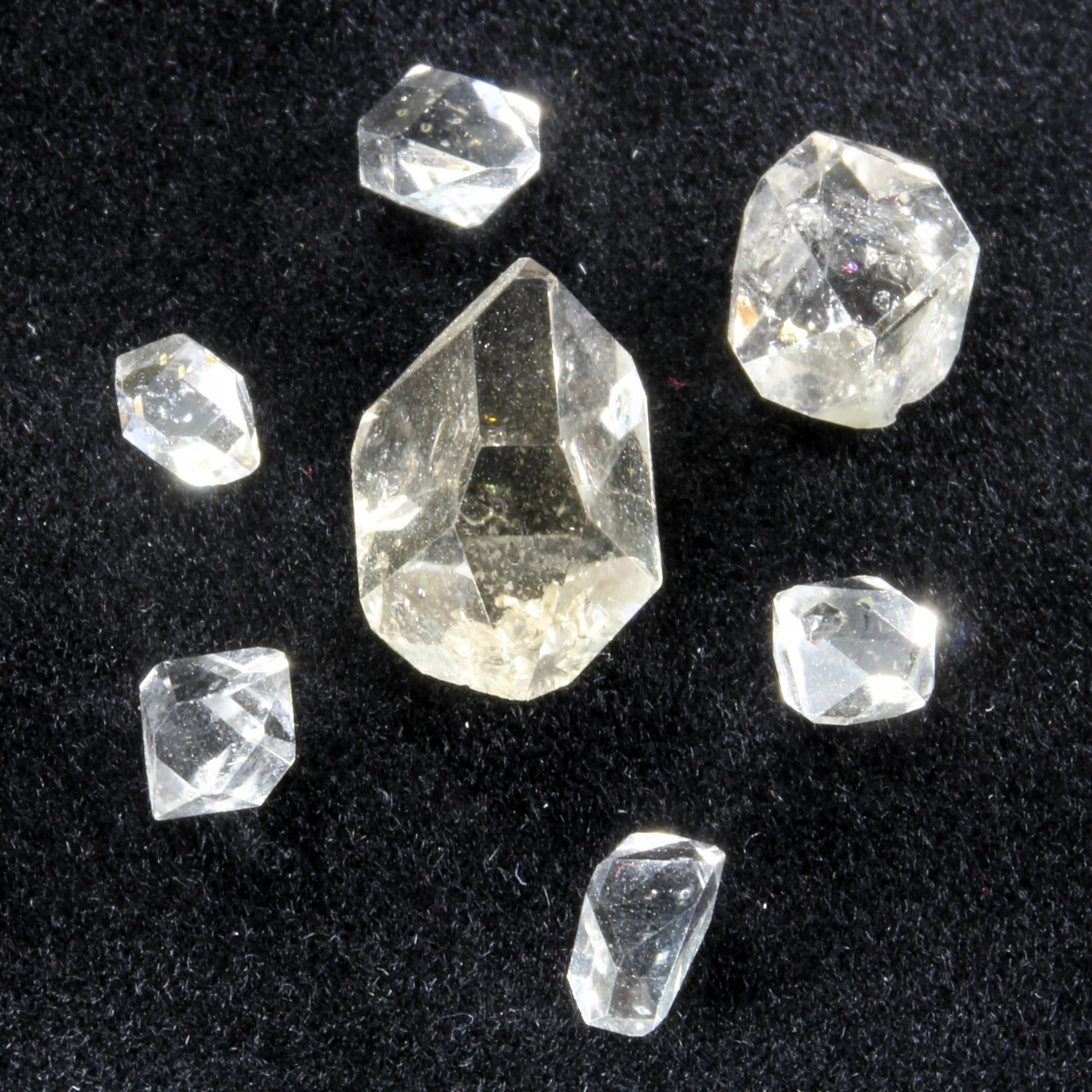
Crystals of type "Maramureș diamond" found in the Ukrainian Carpathians.

The geologic history of these crystals began about 500 million years ago in a shallow sea which was receiving sediments from the ancient Adirondack Mountains to the north. The calcium and magnesium carbonate sediments accumulated and lithified to form the dolomite bedrock currently known as the Little Falls Formation and formerly as the Little Falls Dolostone. While buried, cavities were formed by acidic waters forming the vugs in which the quartz crystals formed. While the dolomite unit is Cambrian, the quartz within the vugs is interpreted to have formed during the Carboniferous Period. Waxy organic material, silicon dioxide and pyrite were present as minor constituents of rock made of dolomite and calcite. As sediment buried the rock and temperatures rose, crystals grew in the cavities very slowly, resulting in quartz crystals of exceptional clarity. Inclusions present in these crystals provide clues to the origins of the Herkimer diamonds. Found within the inclusions are solids, liquids (salt water or petroleum), gases (most often carbon dioxide), two- and three-phase inclusions, and negative (uniaxial) crystals. A black hydrocarbon is the most common solid inclusion.

== See also ==
- Cape May diamonds, another form of quartz referred to as "diamonds"
