= 1987 in the United Kingdom =

Events from the year 1987 in the United Kingdom.

The major political event of this year is the re-election of Margaret Thatcher in June's general election, making her the longest continuously serving Prime Minister of the United Kingdom since Lord Liverpool in the early 19th century. The year is also marked by six disasters: the 1987 United Kingdom and Ireland cold wave, the sinking of the ferry Herald of Free Enterprise, the Hungerford massacre, the "Great Storm", the Remembrance Day bombing and the King's Cross fire.

== Incumbents ==
- Monarch – Elizabeth II
- Prime Minister – Margaret Thatcher (Conservative)

== Events ==
=== January ===
- January – 1987 United Kingdom and Ireland cold wave: Most of Britain is affected by heavy snow and sub-zero temperatures.
- 1 January
  - Personal equity plans permitting tax-free investments in shares are introduced.
  - Release of cult black comedy film Withnail and I.
- 2 January – Golliwogs in Enid Blyton books are replaced by the publisher with gnomes following complaints that golliwogs are offensive to Black people.
- 4 January – Economists predict that unemployment will fall below the 3,000,000 mark by the end of this year.
- 5 January – Harold Macmillan, Lord Stockton, former Prime Minister, is buried in the village of Horsted Keynes, having died on 29 December at the age of 92.
- 7 January – Telford, the new town created in Shropshire some 20 years ago, is reported to have the highest unemployment rate in the West Midlands region, eclipsing the unemployment levels seen in the city of Birmingham and nearby towns including Wolverhampton, Brierley Hill, Wednesbury and Bilston, which have lost a large percentage of traditional heavy industry since the late-1970s, although Brierley Hill's unemployment crisis is beginning to ease with the ongoing development of the Merry Hill Shopping Centre, which already includes two retail parks and a large shopping mall and is set to expand even further by the end of the decade.
- 13 January – Prince Edward leaves the Royal Marines just three months after joining.
- 14 January – 1987 United Kingdom and Ireland cold wave: Heavy snow falls across Britain leaving houses, towns, roads, railways and motor vehicles stranded and blocked.
- 15 January – Unemployment is reported to have fallen in December 1986 for the fifth month in succession.
- 20 January
  - Terry Waite, the special envoy of the Archbishop of Canterbury in Lebanon, disappears in Beirut whilst negotiating for the release of hostages; he will himself remain a hostage until 1991.
  - Police arrest 26 suspected football hooligans across Britain after a mass operation.
- 30 January – The flotation of British Airways on the stock market begins.

=== February ===
- February – Ford launches a facelifted Sierra range which now includes a saloon model called the Sapphire.
- 11 February
  - British Airways is privatised and listed on the London Stock Exchange.
  - Cynthia Payne is acquitted of controlling prostitutes in her London home.
- 12 February – Edwina Currie sparks controversy by stating that "good Christians won't get AIDS".
- 24 February – It is alleged that six Nazi war criminals are living in the UK.
- 26 February
  - Church of England's General Synod votes to allow the ordination of women.
  - Rosie Barnes wins the Greenwich parliamentary seat for the Social Democratic Party (SDP) from Labour at a by-election, caused by the death of the Labour MP Guy Barnett on Christmas Eve the previous year.

=== March ===
- 3 March – National Health Service prescription charges are increased from £2.20 to £2.40.
- 6 March
  - British Channel ferry Herald of Free Enterprise capsizes while leaving the harbour of Zeebrugge, Belgium, killing 193 on board.
  - The value of the pound is at a five-year high.
- 13 March – 25-year-old Matthew Taylor retains Truro for the Liberals at the by-election caused by the death of David Penhaligon in a car accident three months ago.
- 19 March – Winston Silcott is sentenced to life imprisonment for the murder of PC Keith Blakelock in the Tottenham riots 17 months ago.
- 23 March – 31 people are injured when a suspected Provisional Irish Republican Army (IRA) bomb explodes at a British army barracks in Rheindahlen, West Germany.
- 27 March – Leader of the Opposition Neil Kinnock meets U.S. President Ronald Reagan in Washington, D.C.
- 28 March – Former Doctor Who actor Patrick Troughton dies of a heart attack at a hotel in Columbus, Georgia, aged 67.
- 29 March – Prime Minister Margaret Thatcher visits Moscow.
- 30 March – Christie's auction house in London sells one of Vincent van Gogh's iconic Sunflowers paintings for £24,750,000.

=== April ===
- 1 April – MPs vote against the restoration of the death penalty by 342–230.
- 3 April – The jewellery of the late Duchess of Windsor is sold at auction for £31,000,000 six times the expected value.
- 5 April – Arsenal win the Football League Cup for the first time in their history with a 2–1 win over Liverpool, earning them their first major trophy since 1979. Charlie Nicholas scores both of Arsenal's goals.
- 9 April – The Broderip Ward, the first hospital ward dedicated to the treatment of people with HIV/AIDS in the United Kingdom is opened by Diana, Princess of Wales at the Middlesex Hospital in London.
- 16 April – Conservative MP Harvey Proctor appears in court charged with gross indecency.
- 22 April – Former Prime Minister James Callaghan is appointed to the Order of the Garter. He will be retiring from Parliament at this year's general election.
- 29 April – Chancellor Nigel Lawson promises that the UK will soon have an income tax rate of 25p in the pound.
- 30 April – The House of Lords acting in a judicial capacity approves the sterilisation of a "mentally subnormal" 17-year-old female.

=== May ===
- 4 May – Everton win the Football League First Division title for the ninth time in their history.
- 8 May – Loughgall ambush: Soldiers of the SAS kill eight members of the Provisional Irish Republican Army at Loughgall, County Antrim.
- 10 May – The church of St Mary-at-Hill in the City of London is damaged in a fire.
- 11 May
  - Margaret Thatcher calls a general election for Thursday, 11 June; with most of the opinion polls pointing towards her securing a third successive election victory for the Conservatives, with the Labour opposition expected to increase its share of votes and seat tally at its first general election under the leadership of Neil Kinnock.
  - British Rail renames Second class travel as Standard class.
- 14 May – Unemployment has fallen to 3,107,128.
- 15 May – Family Law Reform Act removes remaining legal distinctions between children born to married and unmarried parents.
- 16 May – Coventry City F.C. win the FA Cup for the first time in their history with a 3–2 win in the final over Tottenham Hotspur, who have won all of their previous seven FA Cup finals.
- 25 May – Aldershot F.C. become the first team to win promotion through the new Football League playoffs, winning promotion from the Fourth Division with a 3–0 aggregate win over Wolverhampton Wanderers (who have a total of eight major trophies to their name, the most recent seven years ago). The Hampshire club have already condemned another side, Bolton Wanderers (four times FA Cup winners) to relegation to the Fourth Division for the first time in their history.

=== June ===
- 3 June – The last MORI poll before the general election shows the Conservatives 11 points ahead of Labour with 43% of the vote, while the Liberal/SDP Alliance's support stands at 24% and their hopes of building on their result at the last general election look exceedingly slim.
- 7 June – Chessington Zoo is renamed Chessington World of Adventures and made into a theme park by owner Madame Tussaud's.
- 11 June – The 1987 general election sees Margaret Thatcher secure her third term in office as Prime Minister of the United Kingdom. Her parliamentary majority is reduced to 102 compared to the 144-seat majority gained at the election four years earlier, but will still not be exceeded by the Conservative Party as of 2019. High-profile casualties of the election include: the former SDP leader Roy Jenkins (once a Labour home secretary) and the Ulster Unionist Party's 75-year-old Enoch Powell (a former Conservative MP). Four ethnic minority candidates are successful: Diane Abbott, Paul Boateng, Bernie Grant and Keith Vaz. Among the MPs retiring from parliament is 75-year-old James Callaghan, the former prime minister.
- 13 June
  - The Queen attends Trooping the Colour for the first time in a carriage, and the first time not in uniform, which she will do for the remainder of her reign.
  - The Queen grants the title of Princess Royal to her daughter Anne, 22 years after the death of the previous holder.
- 18 June – Unemployment has fallen below the 3,000,000 mark for the first time since 1981, after the biggest monthly fall in unemployment since records began in 1948; seeing more than 100,000 of the unemployed find work in May.
- 19 June – Howard Kendall, manager of Football League champions Everton, resigns to take over of Athletic Club Bilbao in Spain. His successor at Everton is the club's assistant manager Colin Harvey.
- 22 June – A riot takes place in Chapeltown, Leeds.
- 25 June – A MORI poll shows support for the Conservative Party stands at almost 50% – the highest during Margaret Thatcher's time as leader.
- 27 June – 25 years after the first James Bond film was released, the fifteenth, The Living Daylights, premieres in London, with the spy now being played by Timothy Dalton.
- 30 June – Footballer Peter Beardsley, the 26-year-old England striker, becomes the most expensive player transferred between British clubs when he completes a £1,900,000 move from Newcastle United to Liverpool.

=== July ===
- 12 July – £60,000,000 is stolen during the Knightsbridge Security Deposit robbery.
- 16 July
  - British Airways and British Caledonian agree a £237,000,000 merger.
  - Unemployment is reported to be down to just over 2,900,000.
- 22 July – Palestinian cartoonist Naji al-Ali is shot in London; his condition is described as "critical".
- 24 July – Novelist and former Conservative MP Jeffrey Archer wins a libel case against the Daily Star newspaper over allegations that he was involved in a vice ring. In 2001 he will be convicted and imprisoned for perjury in connection with this case.
- 27 July – Rick Astley's "Never Gonna Give You Up" is released, the first of eight of his singles to reach the Top 10 in the UK.
- 29 July – The Channel Tunnel is given the go-ahead after Margaret Thatcher and François Mitterrand ratify the Treaty of Canterbury. It is expected to be open within six years and in fact opens in 1994.
- 30 July – The Docklands Light Railway in London, the first driverless railway in Great Britain, is opened by The Queen; passenger service will begin a month later.
- 31 July – The Attorney General institutes legal proceedings against The Daily Telegraph to prevent it publishing details from the book Spycatcher on security grounds.

=== August ===
- 4 August – Just months after confessing to a further two murders, the Moors Murderer Ian Brady claims that he committed a further five murders.
- 6 August – Dr. David Owen resigns as Leader of the Social Democratic Party after its members vote to merge with the Liberals.
- 10 August – One person a day in Britain is now reported to be dying of AIDS.
- 13 August
  - First building of post-war design to be Listed: Bracken House in the City of London, designed by Sir Albert Richardson as the Financial Times headquarters (1955–9).
  - Unemployment continues to fall, with the twelfth successive monthly fall bringing the national total to less than 2,900,000.
- 19 August
  - Hungerford massacre: Michael Ryan shoots dead fourteen people in the Berkshire town of Hungerford (with weapons including semi-automatic rifles) before taking his own life. 16 people are injured, some of them seriously. On 21 August the death toll rises to 16 when two more victims die in hospital from their injuries.
  - The Order of the Garter is opened to women.
- 24 August – Comedian and music hall veteran Douglas Byng dies aged 94.
- 27 August – Robert Maclennan replaces David Owen as Leader of the Social Democratic Party.
- 29 August – Naji al-Ali dies in hospital more than five weeks after being shot.
- 30 August – David Owen forms a breakaway faction of the SDP.

=== September ===
- 7 September – Ford completes its takeover of the luxury sports car company Aston Martin.
- 9 September – 25 Liverpool football fans are extradited to Belgium to face charges of manslaughter in connection with the Heysel Stadium disaster more than two years ago.
- 11 September – The Government announces plans to abolish the Inner London Education Authority.
- 22 September – The Government bans automatic weapons of the type used in the Hungerford massacre.
- 23 September – An Australian court lifts the ban on the publication of Spycatcher.

=== October ===
- October – Construction work begins on the extension to the M40 motorway between Oxford and Birmingham. It is hoped that the motorway, providing an alternative route to the M6 and M1 from the Midlands to London as well as improving road links with the Midlands and the South Coast ports, will be fully operational by 1990.
- 1 October
  - Black History Month first celebrated in the UK.
  - Territorial Sea Act (passed 15 May) comes into effect, extending UK territorial waters to 12 nautical miles.
  - Swedish home product retailer IKEA opens its first British store at Warrington in Cheshire.
- 9 October – Margaret Thatcher tells the Conservative Party Conference in Blackpool that she wants to continue as prime minister until 1994 and the age of 69, which would make her Britain's oldest prime minister since Harold Macmillan in 1963. She is already three months away from becoming Britain's longest-serving prime minister this century, exceeding the previous record set by H. H. Asquith of the Liberal Party more than 70 years ago, but will be forced by her party to resign in 1990.
- 11 October – £1,000,000 Operation Deepscan in Loch Ness fails to locate the legendary Loch Ness Monster.
- 15–16 October – Great storm: Hurricane force winds batter much of south-east England, killing 23 people and causing extensive damage to property. Two days after the end of the storm, some 250,000 homes in the region will still be without electricity.
- 19 October
  - Black Monday: Wall Street crash leads to £50,000,000,000 being wiped of the value of shares on the London stock exchange.
  - Glanrhyd Bridge collapse: A train runs off the end of a bridge that has collapsed into the River Towy in Wales due to flooding, killing four people.
- 23 October – Retired English jockey Lester Piggott is jailed for three years after being convicted of tax evasion.
- 25 October – Peugeot begins production of its second car, the 405 four-door saloon at the Ryton plant near Coventry. The first customers are set to take delivery of their cars after Christmas. A French-built estate version will be launched next year.

=== November ===
- November – The first acid house raves are reported in the United Kingdom, many of them being in derelict buildings.
- 1 November – British Rail establishes a world speed record for diesel traction, 148.4 mph (238.9 km/h) with a test InterCity 125 formation between Darlington and York.
- 2 November – Peter Brooke succeeds Norman Tebbit as Chairman of the Conservative Party.
- 3 November – It is announced that unemployment in Britain fell quicker during October than in any other European country.
- 5 November – London City Airport opens.
- 8 November – Enniskillen bombing: Eleven people are killed by a Provisional Irish Republican Army bomb at a Remembrance Day service in Enniskillen.
- 11 November – Customs officers in Southampton seize more than £50,000,000 worth of cocaine – the most expensive haul of the drug ever found in the UK.
- 12 November – Unemployment has fallen to 2,700,000 (just under 10% of the workforce), the lowest level of unemployment recorded in Britain for over six years.
- 17 November
  - The Government announces that the Poll tax (community charge) to fund local government will be introduced in England and Wales in April 1990.
  - Fireman Sam, a children's television series about a fireman voiced and narrated by John Alderton, debuts on BBC1.
- 18 November – King's Cross fire: A fire on an escalator at King's Cross station on the London Underground kills 31 people.
- 19 November – Conservative support has reached 50% in a MORI poll for the first time.
- 24 November – The Government announces that eye tests will no longer be provided free of charge by the National Health Service.

=== December ===
- December – The British-built Peugeot 405 wins the European Car of the Year award, the first Peugeot to be given the title for nearly 20 years. British sales begin in the new year, several months after it was launched in France.
- 9 December – The England cricket team's tour of Pakistan is nearly brought to a premature end when captain Mike Gatting and umpire Shakoor Rana row during a Test Match.
- 15 December – Channel Tunnel construction is initiated, and it is expected to open in 1993 or early-1994 (in the event, it will be mid to late 1994).
- 17 December – A year that has seen an excellent performance for the British economy ends with unemployment reported to have fallen below the 2,700,000 mark; having started the year in excess of 3,000,000.
- 25 December – ITV enjoys a record breaking audience when more than 26,000,000 viewers tune in for the Christmas Day episode of Coronation Street, in which Hilda Ogden (Jean Alexander) makes her final appearance on the show after 23 years.
- 29 December – The Kylie Minogue single "I Should Be So Lucky" is released by PWL. Australian Minogue, 19, of maternal Welsh heritage, is already hugely popular with British audiences for her role in the TV soap Neighbours which debuted on the BBC fourteen months ago.
- 31 December – 31 British and Belgian people are recognised in the New Year Honours for heroism shown in the rescue operation at the Zeebrugge Disaster earlier in the year.

=== Undated ===
- Inflation remains low for the sixth year running, standing at 4.2% for 1987.
- Largest ever deficit to date on UK balance of payments.
- With overall unemployment falling below 3,000,000, youth unemployment is now below the 1,000,000 mark.
- Overall economy growth for the year reaches 5.5% – the highest since 1963.

== Publications ==
- London Daily News, short-lived newspaper (24 February – 23 July)
- Iain M. Banks' novel Consider Phlebas.
- Iain Banks' novel Espedair Street.
- William Golding's novel Close Quarters, second of the To the Ends of the Earth trilogy.
- Paul Kennedy's historical study The Rise and Fall of the Great Powers.
- Penelope Lively's novel Moon Tiger.
- Ian McEwan's novel The Child in Time.
- Terry Pratchett's Discworld novels Equal Rites and Mort.

== Births ==
=== January ===
- 6 January – Gemma Gibbons, judoka
- 8 January – Freddie Stroma, actor
- 9 January
  - Sam Bird, racing driver
  - Paolo Nutini, Scottish pop-rock singer-songwriter
- 11 January — Jamie Vardy, footballer
- 23 January – Michael Christie, Scottish field hockey defender
- 27 January – Lily Donaldson, model
- 28 January – Misha Crosby, actor
- 30 January – Phil Lester, YouTuber and radio presenter
- 31 January – Marcus Mumford, folk rock singer-songwriter (Mumford & Sons)

=== February ===
- 2 February – Jill Scott, footballer
- 7 February – Joe Cardle, footballer
- 8 February – Chris Erskine, Scottish footballer
- 9 February – Rose Leslie, Scottish actress
- 14 February – Scott Dann, footballer
- 15 February – Alex Rodman, footballer
- 17 February – Keiron Jenkins, Welsh rugby union player
- 21 February – Tuppence Middleton, actress
- 22 February – Shaun Batt, footballer
- 27 February – Scott Davies, footballer

=== March ===
- 4 March – Tamzin Merchant, actress
- 6 March – Hannah Taylor-Gordon, actress
- 9 March – Stacey Dooley, TV personality
- 12 March – Chris Stark, radio DJ
- 27 March – Zaraah Abrahams, actress

=== April ===
- 2 April
  - Marc Pugh, footballer
  - Molly Smitten-Downes, singer-songwriter
- 3 April – Benjamin Stone, actor
- 11 April – Joss Stone, soul singer
- 16 April – Aaron Lennon, English footballer
- 19 April – Joe Hart, English footballer
- 27 April – William Moseley, actor
- 28 April – Bradley Johnson, footballer

=== May ===
- 1 May – Matt Di Angelo, actor
- 5 May – Jessie Cave, actress
- 7 May – Mark Reynolds, footballer
- 8 May – Mark Noble, footballer
- 9 May – Dan Cole, rugby union player
- 12 May – David Foley, English footballer
- 15 May – Sir Andy Murray, Scottish tennis player
- 20 May – Fra Fee, Northern Irish actor and singer
- 26 May – Aaron Chalmers, TV personality and martial artist
- 28 May
  - Andrew Bowie, politician
  - Liam Shotton, footballer

=== June ===
- 3 June – Michelle Keegan, actress
- 4 June
  - Mollie King, pop singer-songwriter
  - Luisa Zissman, TV personality
- 5 June – Charlie Clements, actor
- 9 June – James Maynard, mathematician
- 11 June – Dappy, rapper
- 18 June – Moeen Ali, cricketer
- 24 June
  - Josh Lillis, footballer
  - Nicholas Robinson-Baker, diver
- 27 June
  - Ed Westwick, actor
  - India de Beaufort, actress

=== July ===
- 1 July
  - Scott Benton, politician
  - John Hathaway, mixed martial artist
- 6 July – Kate Nash, indie pop singer-songwriter
- 7 July – Carly Telford, England footballer
- 10 July – Amy Oliver, archer
- 13 July – Chloe Madeley, journalist and model
- 20 July – Nicola Benedetti, violinist
- 29 July – Alice Dellal, model

=== August ===
- 1 August – Karen Carney, football player and journalist
- 4 August
  - Jon Lilygreen, Welsh singer
  - Sam Underwood, English actor
  - Phil Younghusband, British-Filipino footballer
- 11 August
  - Adam Thomas, philanthropist
  - Jemima West, Anglo-French actress
- 14 August
  - James Buckley, actor
  - Nikki Kidd, Scottish field hockey forward
- 15 August – Sean McAllister, footballer
- 24 August – Ollie Hancock, racing driver

=== September ===
- 2 September - Audrey Tait, Scottish drummer (Franz Ferdinand, Hector Bizerk)
- 3 September – Chris Fountain, actor
- 4 September – Mike O'Shea, cricketer
- 11 September – Elizabeth Henstridge, actress
- 15 September – Christian Cooke, actor
- 16 September – Kyle Lafferty, Northern Irish footballer
- 17 September – Augustus Prew, actor
- 22 September – Tom Felton, actor
- 24 September – Matthew Connolly, footballer
- 27 September – Luke Campbell, boxer

=== October ===
- 3 October
  - Robert Grabarz, high jumper
  - Martin Plowman, racing driver
- 4 October – Daniel Anthony, actor
- 9 October – Samantha Murray, tennis player

=== November ===
- 10 November – Andrew Koji, actor
- 14 November – Dimitri Leonidas, actor
- 21 November – Aimee-Ffion Edwards, actress
- 23 November – Sophie Anderson, pornographic actress (d. 2023)
- 27 November – Lashana Lynch, actress
- 28 November – Karen Gillan, actress and director
- 30 November – Dougie Poynter, pop rock bassist (McFly)

=== December ===
- 11 December – William Wragg, politician
- 20 December – Winston Marshall, musician (Mumford & Sons)
- 21 December – Rachel Shenton, actress
- 22 December – Lisa Andreas, English singer of Cypriot descent
- 25 December – Jorgie Porter, actress
- 28 December – Hannah Tointon, actress
- 29 December – Iain De Caestecker, actor

== Deaths ==
=== January ===
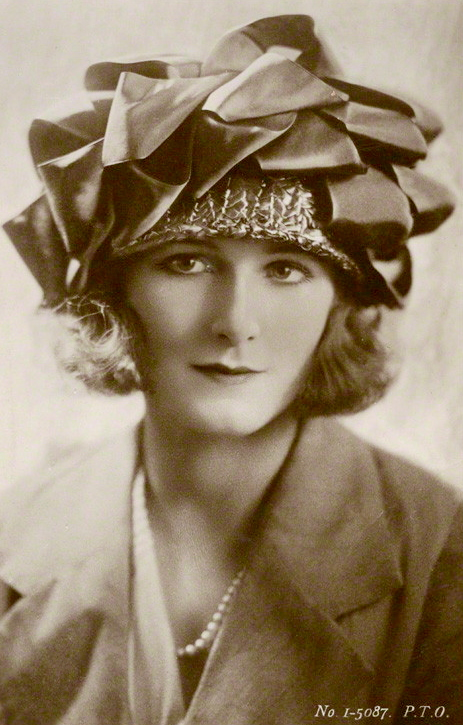
Heather Thatcher

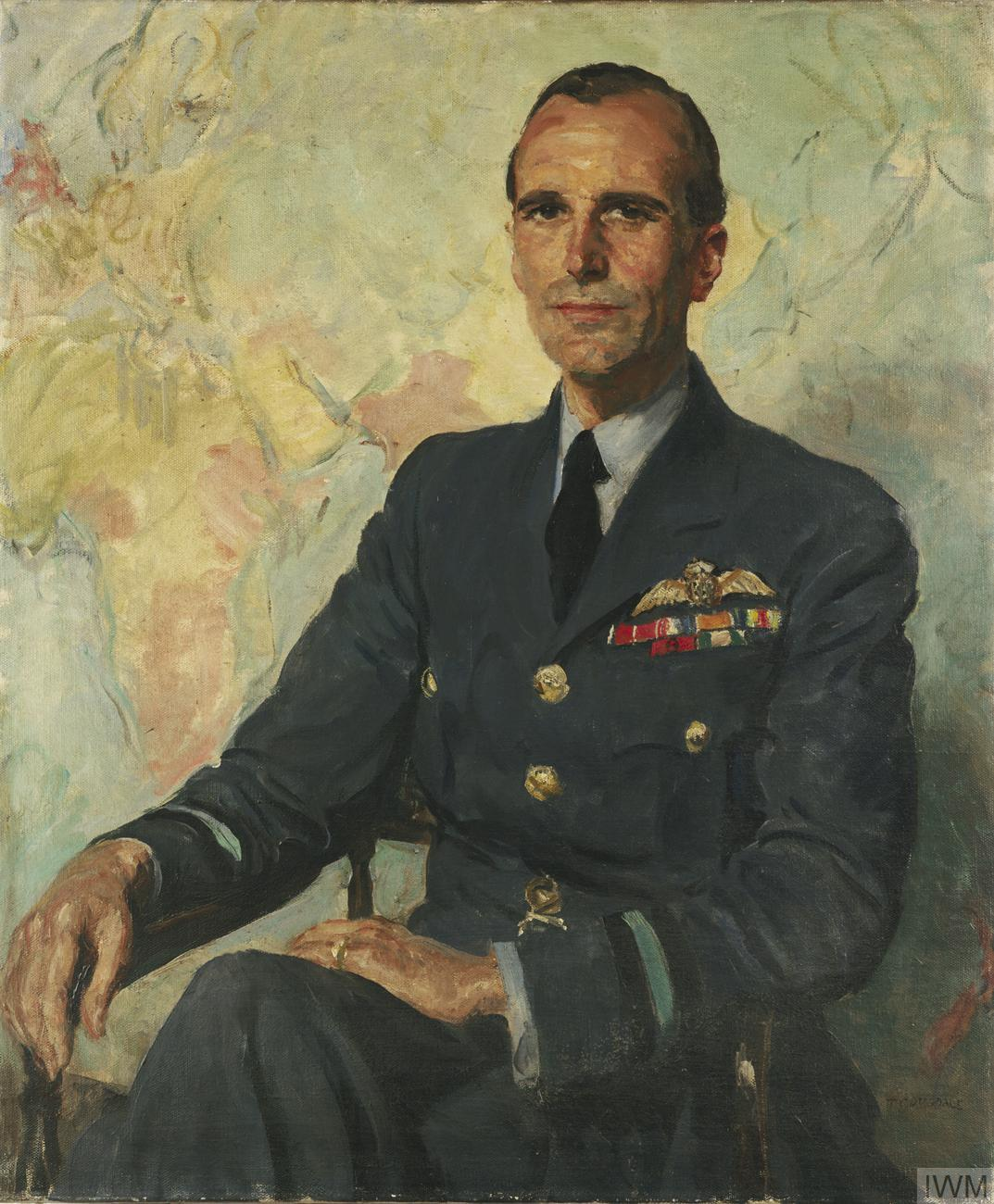
Victor Goddard

- 2 January – Arthur Gould-Porter, actor (born 1905)
- 3 January – Alex Campbell, Scottish singer (born 1931)
- 8 January – Wilfrid Blunt, art historian (born 1901)
- 10 January
  - Ian Harvey, politician (born 1914)
  - David Robinson, philanthropist (born 1904)
- 11 January – Ronald James Marsh, author (born 1914)
- 15 January
  - David Aberdeen, architect (born 1913)
  - John Alexander Fraser Roberts, geneticist and psychologist (born 1899)
  - Heather Thatcher, actress (born 1896)
- 17 January – Elizabeth Dempster, sculptor (born 1909)
- 18 January – Sir George Thalben-Ball, organist and composer (born 1896, Australia)
- 19 January – Dick Milford, clergyman, educator and philanthropist (born 1895)
- 21 January – Sir Victor Goddard, RAF air marshal and World War II veteran (born 1897)
- 22 January
  - Ann Parker Bowles, socialite (born 1918)
  - Patrick du Val, mathematician, discoverer of Du Val singularity (born 1903)
- 24 January – Ruth Bird, historian (born 1899)
- 25 January – William Devlin, actor (born 1911)
- 26 January – Mollie Maureen, actress (born 1904)
- 27 January – Sir Geoffrey Charles Evans, Army lieutenant-general (born 1901)
- 28 January – George Dow, railwayman and author (born 1907)
- 30 January – Johnnie Cradock, cook, writer and broadcaster (born 1904)

=== February ===
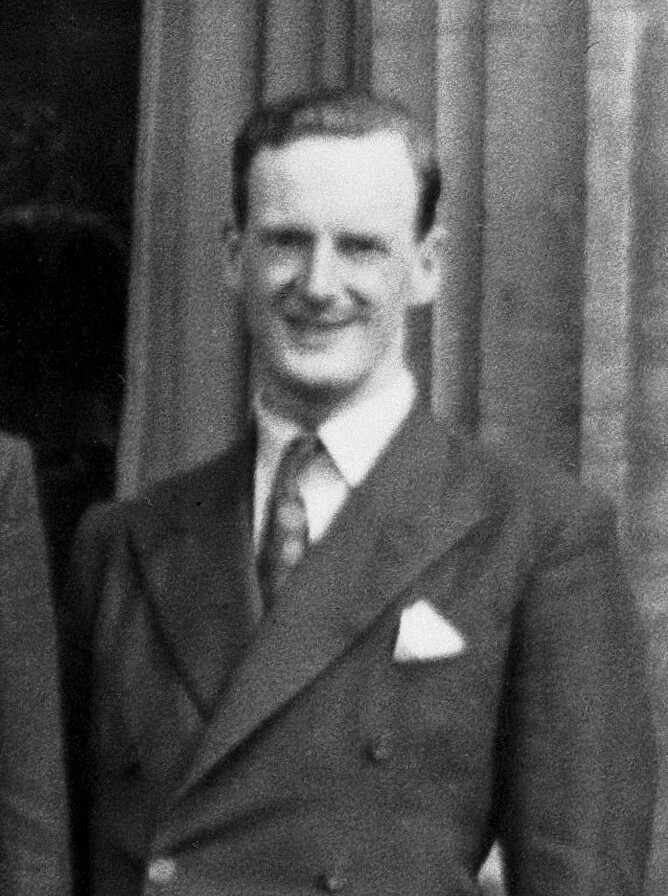
Donald MacCrimmon MacKay

- 2 February
  - Walter Clutterbuck, Army major-general (born 1894)
  - Spike Hughes, jazz musician (born 1908)
  - Alistair MacLean, novelist (heart attack) (born 1922)
  - Ken Reid, comic artist and writer (born 1919)
- 4 February
  - Wynford Vaughan-Thomas, Welsh radio broadcaster (born 1908)
  - Patrick Waddington, actor (born 1901)
- 5 February – David Ensor, Labour politician (born 1906)
- 6 February – Donald MacCrimmon MacKay, physicist (born 1922)
- 7 February – Cyril Horn, speed skater (born 1904)
- 12 February – Dennis Poore, entrepreneur and racing driver (born 1916)
- 16 February – Norman Crowther Hunt, Baron Crowther-Hunt, Labour politician (born 1920)
- 18 February
  - Sir William Coldstream, artist (born 1908)
  - Allan George Williams Whitfield, physician (born 1909)
- 19 February
  - Hugh Carleton Greene, television executive and journalist, Director-General of the BBC (1960–1969) (born 1910)
  - Isabel Hardwich, electrical engineer (born 1919)
- 23 February
  - John Counsell, actor and theatre director (born 1905)
  - Esmond Knight, actor (born 1906)
  - Polly Ward, actress (born 1912)
- 25 February – John Collin, actor (born 1928)
- 26 February – Robert Douglas Lockhart, anatomist (born 1894)
- 28 February
  - Joan Greenwood, actress (born 1921)
  - Tom Stephenson, rambler (born 1893)
  - Stephen Tennant, aristocrat (born 1906)

=== March ===
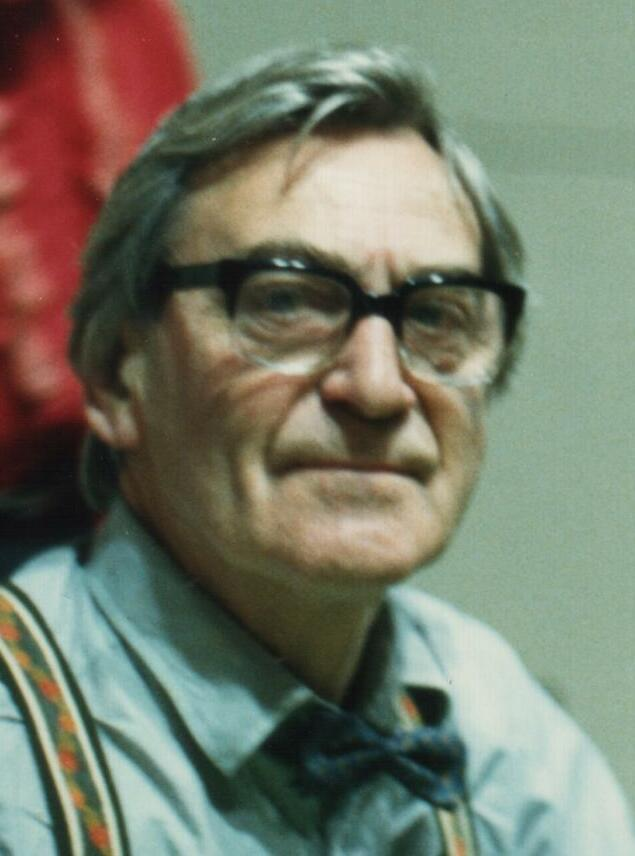
Patrick Troughton

- 2 March – Frederick Parker-Rhodes, linguist and mathematician (born 1914)
- 5 March – John Brooke, 2nd Viscount Brookeborough, peer and politician (born 1922)
- 6 March – J. Spencer Trimingham, Islamic scholar (born 1904)
- 7 March – Evelyn Dove, singer (born 1902)
- 9 March – Arthur Tolcher, harmonica player (born 1922)
- 11 March – Joe Gladwin, actor (born 1906)
- 13 March – Mervyn Williams, RAF pilot (born 1911)
- 14 March – Ian MacAlister Stewart, Army brigadier-general (born 1895)
- 15 March – Michael Ovenden, astronomer (born 1926)
- 18 March
  - Terry Casey, trade union leader (born 1920)
  - Derrick Childs, Anglican prelate, Bishop of Monmouth (1970–1986) (born 1918)
  - Elizabeth Poston, composer, pianist and writer (born 1905)
- 19 March
  - Harold Rosenthal, music critic and writer (born 1917)
  - Tony Stratton Smith, rock music manager (born 1933)
- 22 March – Bill McGuffie, pianist and composer (born 1927)
- 26 March – Robert Gwyn Macfarlane, haematologist (born 1907)
- 28 March – Patrick Troughton, actor (born 1920)
- 29 March
  - Richard Aaron, Welsh philosopher (born 1901)
  - Florence Margaret Spencer Palmer, composer (born 1900)
- 30 March – Dorothy Ward, actress (born 1890)
- March – Lesley Osmond, actress (born 1921)

=== April ===
- 2 April – Trevor Hockey, footballer (heart attack) (born 1943)
- 3 April – Anne Grey, actress (born 1907)
- 4 April – Richard Aaron, philosopher (born 1901)
- 7 April
  - Charles Hope, 3rd Marquess of Linlithgow, peer and businessman (born 1912)
  - John Lehmann, publisher and poet (born 1907)
- 8 April – Terry Allen, boxer (born 1924)
- 10 April – Harry Stokes, snooker player (born 1920)
- 12 April – Oliver Stonor, novelist (born 1903)
- 13 April – Joe Colquhoun, comics artist (born 1926)
- 17 April
  - Cecil Harmsworth King, newspaper editor (born 1901)
  - Arthur Delaney, artist (born 1927)
- 18 April – Hugh B. Cott, zoologist (born 1900)
- 19 April – Antony Tudor, dancer and choreographer (born 1908)
- 24 April
  - Josephine Bell, physician and writer (born 1897)
  - Fred Dyson, trade unionist (born 1916)
- 25 April – Maurice Gibson, Northern Irish judge (murdered by the Provisional IRA) (born 1913)
- 26 April – John Silkin, politician (born 1923)
- 29 April – Thomas Trenchard, 2nd Viscount Trenchard, peer and politician (born 1923)
- 30 April – Hugh Dempster, actor (born 1900)

=== May ===
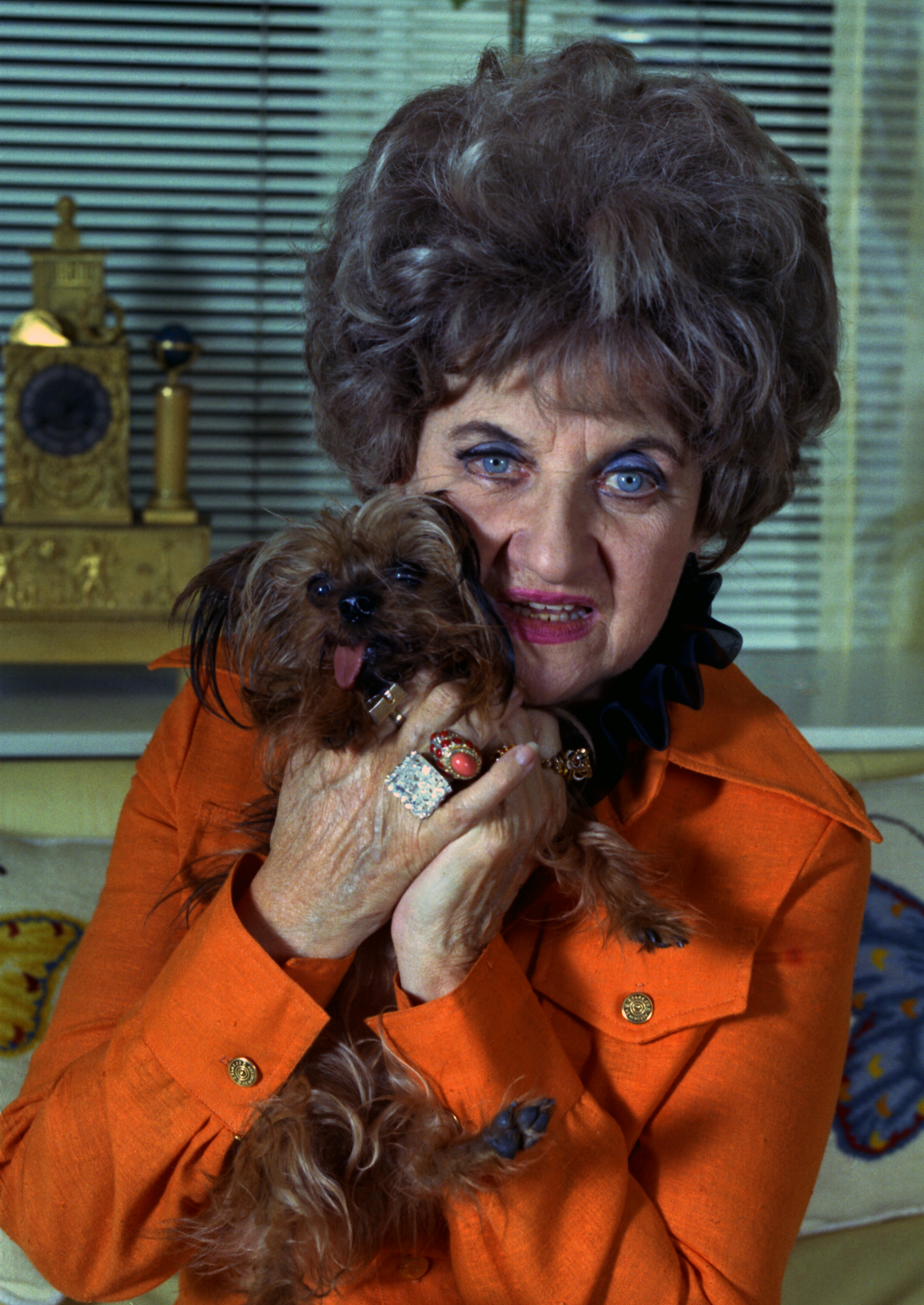
Hermione Gingold

- 3 May – Viola Grosvenor, Duchess of Westminster, aristocrat (born 1912)
- 5 May
  - Sir Hugh Fraser, 2nd Baronet, businessman (born 1936)
  - Herbert Hasler, World War II veteran (born 1914)
- 7 May
  - Colin Blakely, Northern Irish actor (born 1930)
  - Dudley Ryder, 6th Earl of Harrowby, peer (born 1892)
- 10 May – Nicolette Macnamara, artist and author (born 1911)
- 13 May – Forbes Robinson, opera singer (born 1926)
- 15 May – Barry Mannakee, police officer (born 1947; road accident)
- 16 May – Dorothy Farrar, Methodist preacher (born 1899)
- 19 May – Paul Drury, artist and printmaker (born 1903)
- 22 May – Keidrych Rhys, Welsh poet and editor (born 1915)
- 24 May
  - Alan Butler, aviator (born 1898)
  - Hermione Gingold, actress (born 1897)
- 25 May – Peter Gerald Charles Dickens, Royal Navy officer (born 1917)
- 26 May – Robert Easton, opera singer (born 1898)
- 27 May – Cecil Madden, radio and television producer (born 1902)
- 30 May – Eliot Hodgkin, painter (born 1905)
- 31 May – Hubert Raymond Allen, World War II air ace (born 1919)

=== June ===
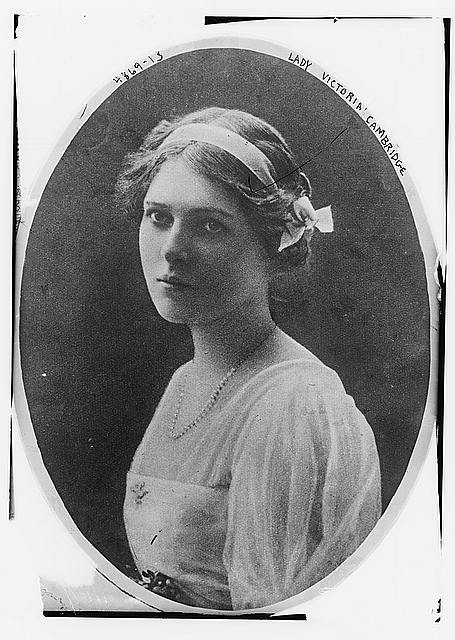
Mary Somerset, Duchess of Beaufort

- 3 June – Alan Montagu-Stuart-Wortley-Mackenzie, 4th Earl of Wharncliffe, peer (born 1935)
- 6 June
  - John L. Jinks, geneticist (born 1929)
  - Fulton Mackay, Scottish actor (born 1922)
- 7 June – John Blofeld, writer on Taoism and Buddhism (born 1913)
- 8 June – E. H. Warmington, classical scholar (born 1898)
- 13 June – Bernard Hesling, artist (born 1905)
- 18 June – Bruce Marshall, Scottish writer (born 1899)
- 19 June
  - C. R. Cheney, historian (born 1906)
  - Ian Donald, physician (born 1910)
- 22 June
  - Nicholas Alkemade, World War II airman (born 1922)
  - John Hewitt, poet (born 1907)
- 23 June – Mary Somerset, Duchess of Beaufort, peeress and sportswoman (born 1897)
- 25 June – Tony Skyrme, physicist (born 1922)
- 26 June – Richard Pim, Royal Navy captain and civil servant (born 1900)
- 29 June – C. Hamilton Ellis, railway writer and painter (born 1909)

=== July ===
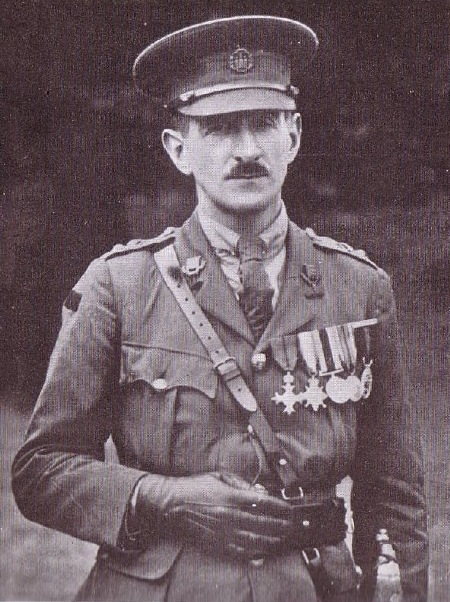
Ernest Achey Loftus

- 1 July – Snakefinger, musician and singer-songwriter (born 1949)
- 3 July – John H. Mercer, glaciologist (born 1922)
- 4 July
  - Edward Addison, RAF vice marshal (born 1898)
  - Sir Alexander Gordon-Lennox, Royal Navy vice-admiral (born 1911)
- 6 July – John Heath, entomologist (born 1922)
- 7 July
  - Ernest Achey Loftus, Army lieutenant-colonel and diarist (born 1884)
  - John Singer, actor (born 1923)
- 12 July – Sir Archibald Hope, 17th Baronet, aviator (born 1912)
- 13 July – Patience Collier, actress (born 1910)
- 15 July
  - Polly Elwes, television announcer (born 1928)
  - Pete King, rock drummer (born 1958)
- 16 July – Alfie Bass, actor (born 1916)
- 17 July – Marjorie Cottle, motorcyclist (born 1900)
- 19 July – Maurice Green, journalist (born 1906)
- 21 July – John Armstrong, Anglican prelate, Archbishop of Armagh (1980–1986) (born 1915)
- 22 July
  - Roger Fiske, musicologist and broadcaster (born 1910)
  - Eugene Halliday, artist (born 1911)
- 23 July – Burke Trend, civil servant (born 1914)
- 24 July – Frank Goodyear, classicist (born 1936)
- 28 July – Philip E. Vernon, British-born Canadian psychologist (born 1905)
- 31 July – Michael Staniforth, actor (born 1942)

=== August ===
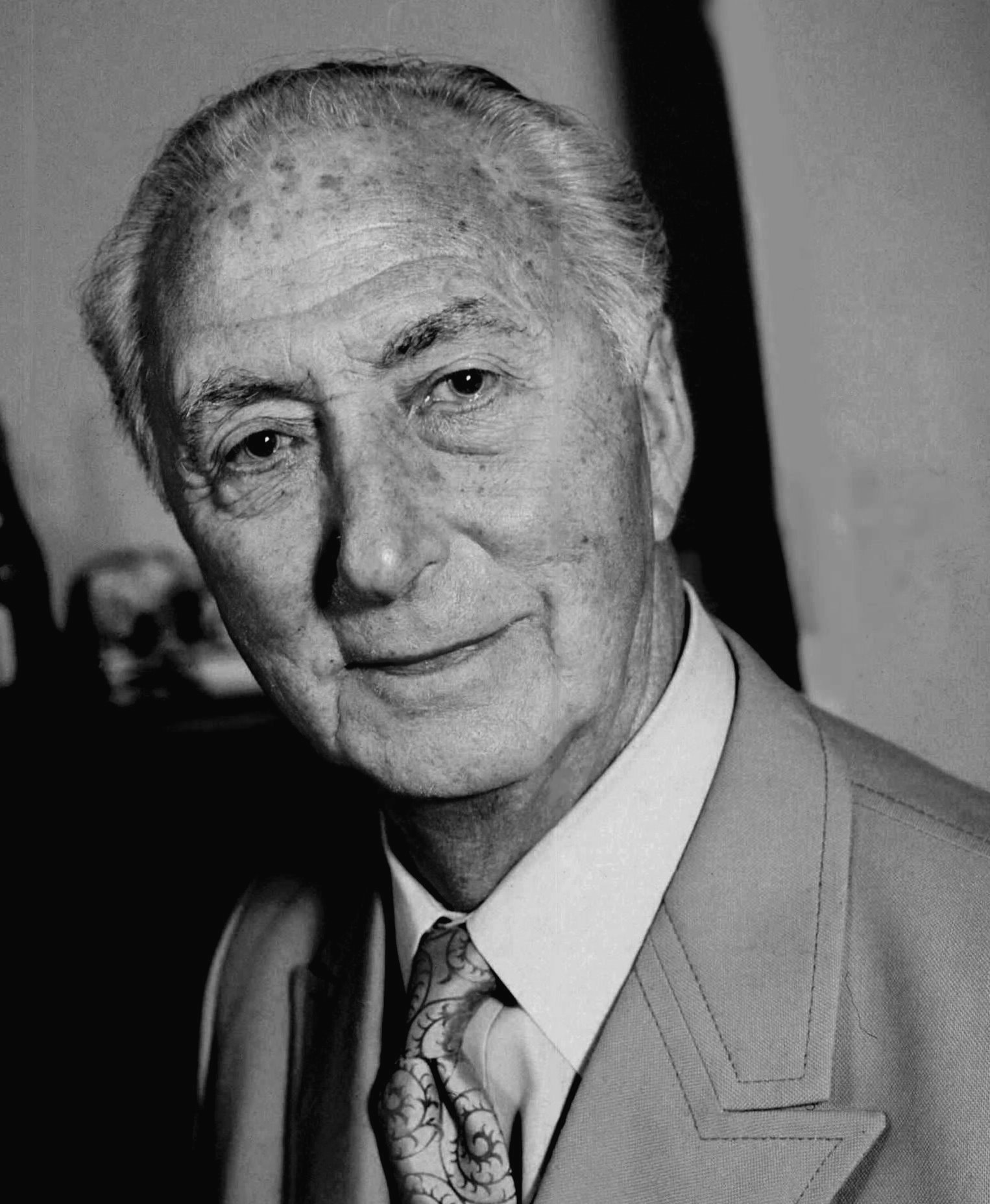
Douglas Byng

- 2 August – Sir Robert Chapman, 2nd Baronet, Army officer (born 1911)
- 6 August – Peter Whigham, poet and translator (born 1925)
- 9 August – Terrence Michael Walsh, singer-songwriter (born 1953)
- 12 August – Crystal Bennett, archaeologist (born 1918)
- 14 August
  - Sydney Bromley, actor (born 1909)
  - Bernard Fagg, archaeologist (born 1915)
  - Freda Gwilliam, educationalist (born 1907)
  - Brewster Mason, actor (born 1922)
- 16 August – Peter Schidlof, violinist (born 1922, Austria)
- 17 August – Frank Beswick, Baron Beswick, Labour politician (born 1911)
- 19 August – Fergus Bowes-Lyon, 17th Earl of Strathmore and Kinghorne, peer (born 1928)
- 20 August – Stanley Cramp, ornithologist (born 1913)
- 21 August – Dorothy Adlington Cadbury, botanist (born 1892)
- 23 August
  - Griselda Allan, artist (born 1905)
  - Malcolm Kirk, wrestler (born 1935)
- 24 August – Douglas Byng, comedian and music hall singer (born 1893)
- 27 August
  - Joan Haythorne, actress (born 1915)
  - Edwin A. Maxwell, mathematician (born 1907)
- 28 August – Harold Samuel, Baron Samuel of Wych Cross, entrepreneur (born 1912)
- 29 August
  - Naji al-Ali, cartoonist, assassinated in London (born c. 1938 in Mandatory Palestine)
  - John R. Napier, primatologist (born 1917)
- 30 August – Harold Fielding, Anglican priest (born 1912)

=== September ===
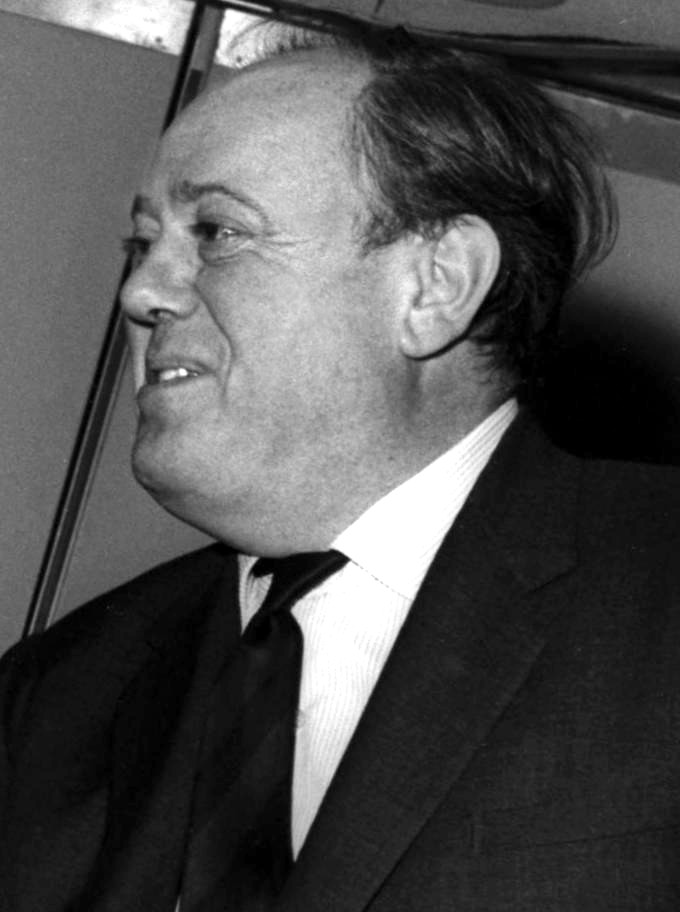
Christopher Soames

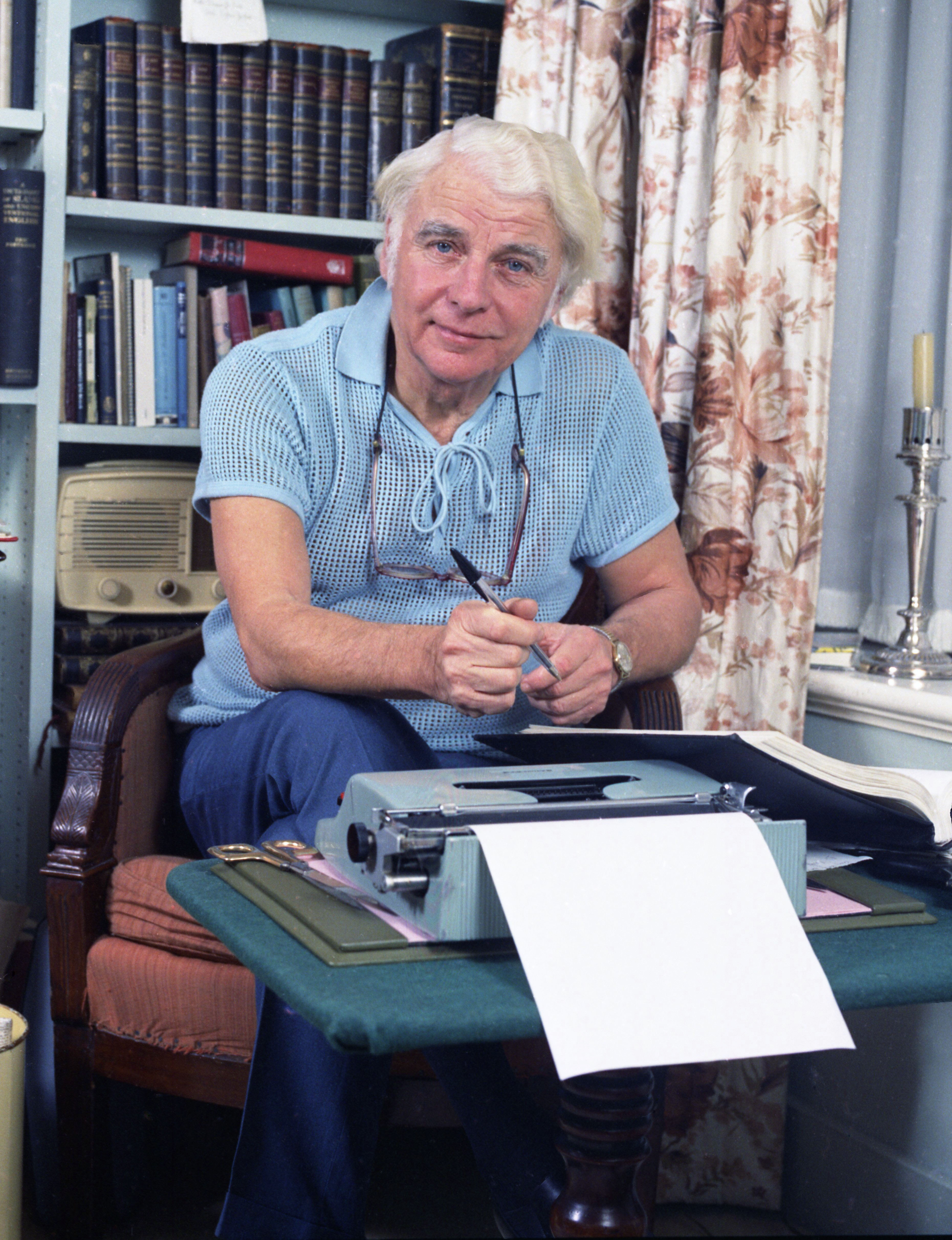
Emlyn Williams

- 1 September – Philip Friend, actor (born 1915)
- 2 September – Vivian Naylor-Leyland, banker (born 1924)
- 3 September
  - Diana Caldwell, aviator and socialite (born 1913)
  - Maxwell Fry, architect, writer and painter (born 1899)
- 4 September – Bill Bowes, cricketer (born 1908)
- 7 September – Harry Locke, actor (born 1913)
- 8 September
  - David Arnold Scott Cairns, judge and politician (born 1902)
  - Robert Sharples, orchestral conductor (born 1913)
- 9 September – Bill Fraser, actor (born 1908)
- 10 September – Benjamin Howard Baker, athlete (born 1892)
- 11 September – Hugh David, television director (born 1925)
- 12 September – Sir William Dickson, RAF air marshal (born 1898)
- 14 September – Stormont Mancroft, 2nd Baron Mancroft, peer and politician (born 1914)
- 15 September – Noel Atherton, cartographer (born 1899)
- 16 September
  - Sir William Cook, mathematician and civil servant (born 1905)
  - Christopher Soames, Baron Soames, politician and last Governor of Southern Rhodesia (born 1920)
- 21 September – John Chandos, actor (born 1917)
- 22 September
  - Henry Herbert, 6th Earl of Carnarvon, peer (born 1898)
  - Giles Henry Robertson, art historian (born 1913)
- 23 September – Louis Kentner, pianist (born 1905, Austria-Hungary)
- 25 September
  - Gerald Chapman, theatre director (born 1949)
  - Emlyn Williams, Welsh dramatist and actor (born 1905)
- 26 September – Edgar Anstey, filmmaker (born 1907)
- 27 September – Jessie Eden, trade unionist and activist (born 1902)
- 29 September – Christopher Boardman, Olympic sailor (born 1903)
- 30 September – Geoffrey Burridge, actor (born 1948)

=== October ===
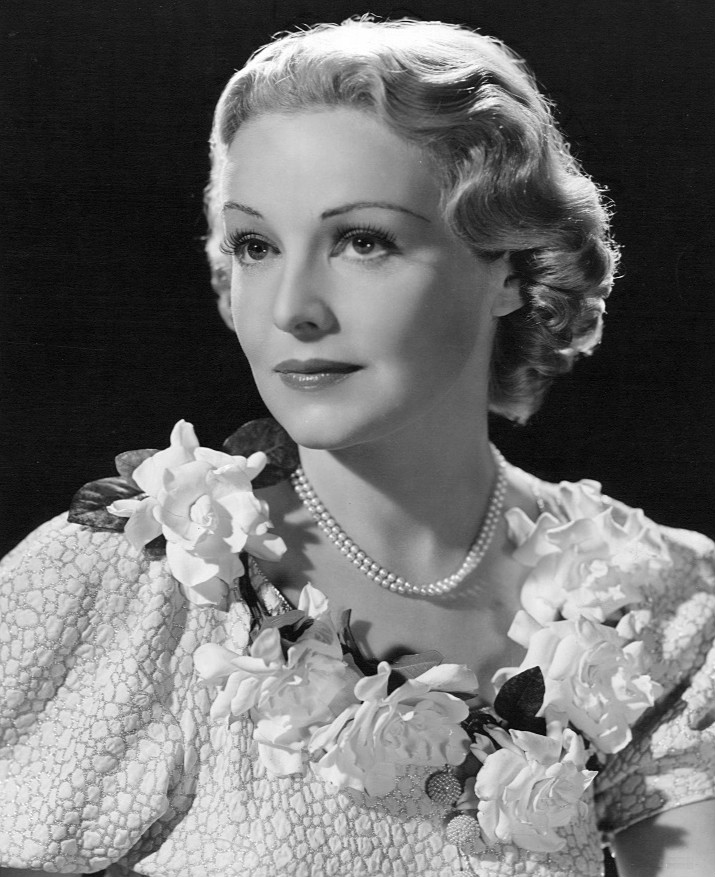
Madeleine Carroll

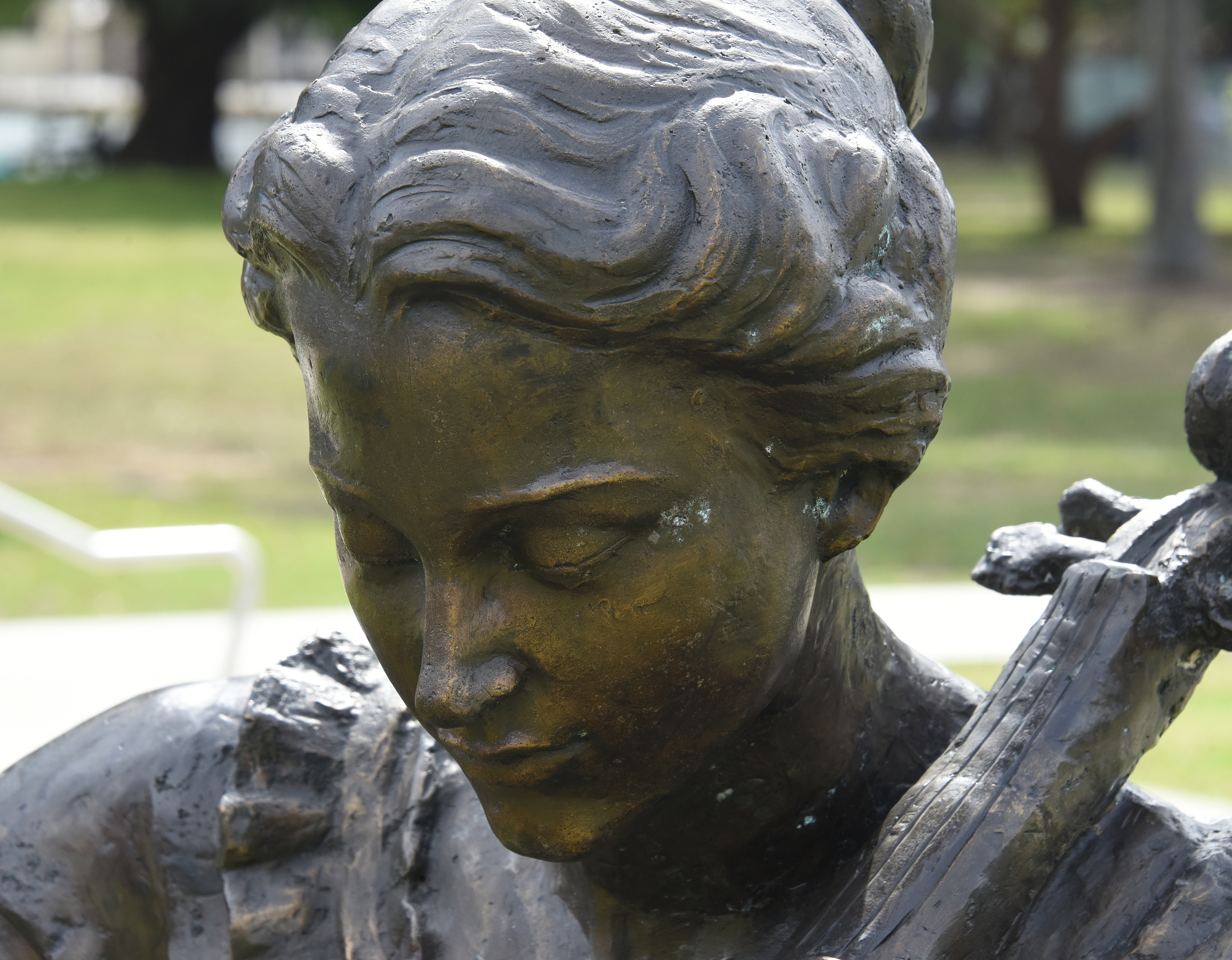
Jacqueline du Pré

- 1 October
  - Douglas Cleverdon, radio producer and bookseller (born 1903)
  - Geoffrey Jackson, diplomat (born 1915)
- 2 October
  - Madeleine Carroll, actress (born 1906)
  - Peter Medawar, immunologist, recipient of Nobel Prize in Physiology or Medicine (born 1915 in Brazil)
- 3 October
  - Catherine Bramwell-Booth, Salvation Army officer (born 1883)
  - Hans Gál, composer (born 1890, Austria-Hungary)
- 7 October – John Fletcher, tubist (born 1941)
- 8 October
  - Rolf Dudley-Williams, aeronautical engineer and Conservative politician (born 1908)
  - Roger Lancelyn Green, writer and biographer (born 1918)
  - Donald McWhinnie, television director (born 1920)
- 11 October – Niall Macpherson, 1st Baron Drumalbyn, Scottish politician (born 1908)
- 13 October – Sir Walter Fraser Oakeshott, schoolmaster and academic (born 1903, Transvaal)
- 14 October
  - Finlay J. MacDonald, Scottish journalist, radio and television producer (born 1925)
  - Basil Wright, filmmaker (born 1907)
- 15 October – Sir Arthur Benson, colonial governor (born 1907)
- 19 October – Jacqueline du Pré, cellist (born 1945)
- 21 October – Bob Simmons, stunt man (born 1923)
- 22 October – Taylor Scott, Royal Navy pilot (parachuting accident) (born 1946)
- 23 October – A. L. Morton, Marxist historian (born 1903)
- 24 October
  - Hallam Ashley, photographer (born 1900)
  - Enid Chadwick, artist (born 1902)
  - Raymond Francis, actor (born 1911)
- 25 October
  - Billy Blyton, Baron Blyton, Labour politician (born 1899)
  - J. A. Ratcliffe, radio physicist (born 1902)
- 29 October – Sir William Davis, Royal Navy admiral (born 1901)
- 31 October – Jimmy Jewell, rock climber (born 1953; accident)

=== November ===
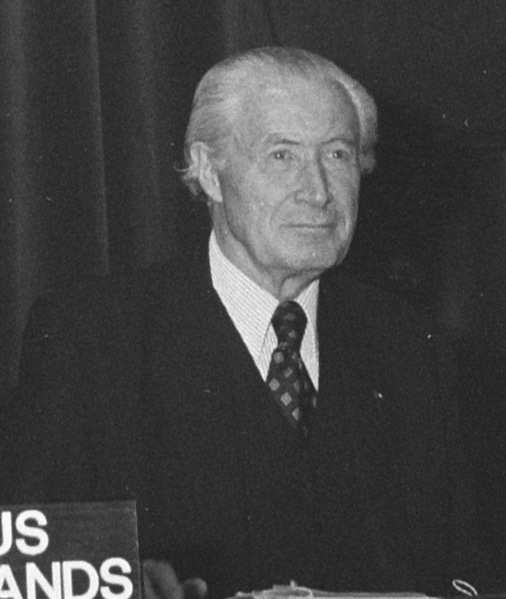
Duncan Sandys

- 1 November – Cameron Cobbold, 1st Baron Cobbold, banker and Governor of the Bank of England (1949–1961) (born 1904)
- 3 November – Albert McCarthy, musicologist (born 1920)
- 4 November
  - Babe Plunket Greene, socialite (born 1907)
  - Francis Pollen, architect (born 1926)
- 7 November – Colin Baron, engineer (born 1921)
- 9 November
  - Christopher Dilke, writer (born 1913)
  - Henry Edward Shortt, protozoologist (born 1887)
- 12 November – George Chatterton, Army brigadier-general (born 1911)
- 14 November – Roger Fleetwood-Hesketh, soldier and politician (born 1902)
- 15 November – Ernő Goldfinger, architect (born 1902, Austria-Hungary)
- 17 November
  - Gladys Carson, Olympic swimmer (born 1903)
  - Gerry Lockran, blues singer-songwriter (born 1942)
- 18 November – Colin Townsley, only firefighter killed in the King's Cross fire (born 1942)
- 19 November – Jock Colville, civil servant and diarist (born 1915)
- 20 November – Christopher Evelyn Blunt, banker and numismatist (born 1904)
- 23 November
  - Eddie Freeman, jazz musician (born 1909)
  - Sarah Long, actress and television presenter (born 1938)
- 24 November – John Parker, Labour politician (born 1906)
- 26 November
  - Morton Lowry, actor (born 1914)
  - Duncan Sandys, politician, son-in-law of Winston Churchill (born 1908)
- 29 November – Irene Handl, actress (born 1901)
- 30 November – Roger Manvell, film director (born 1909)
- November – Violet Aitken, suffragette (born 1886)

=== December ===
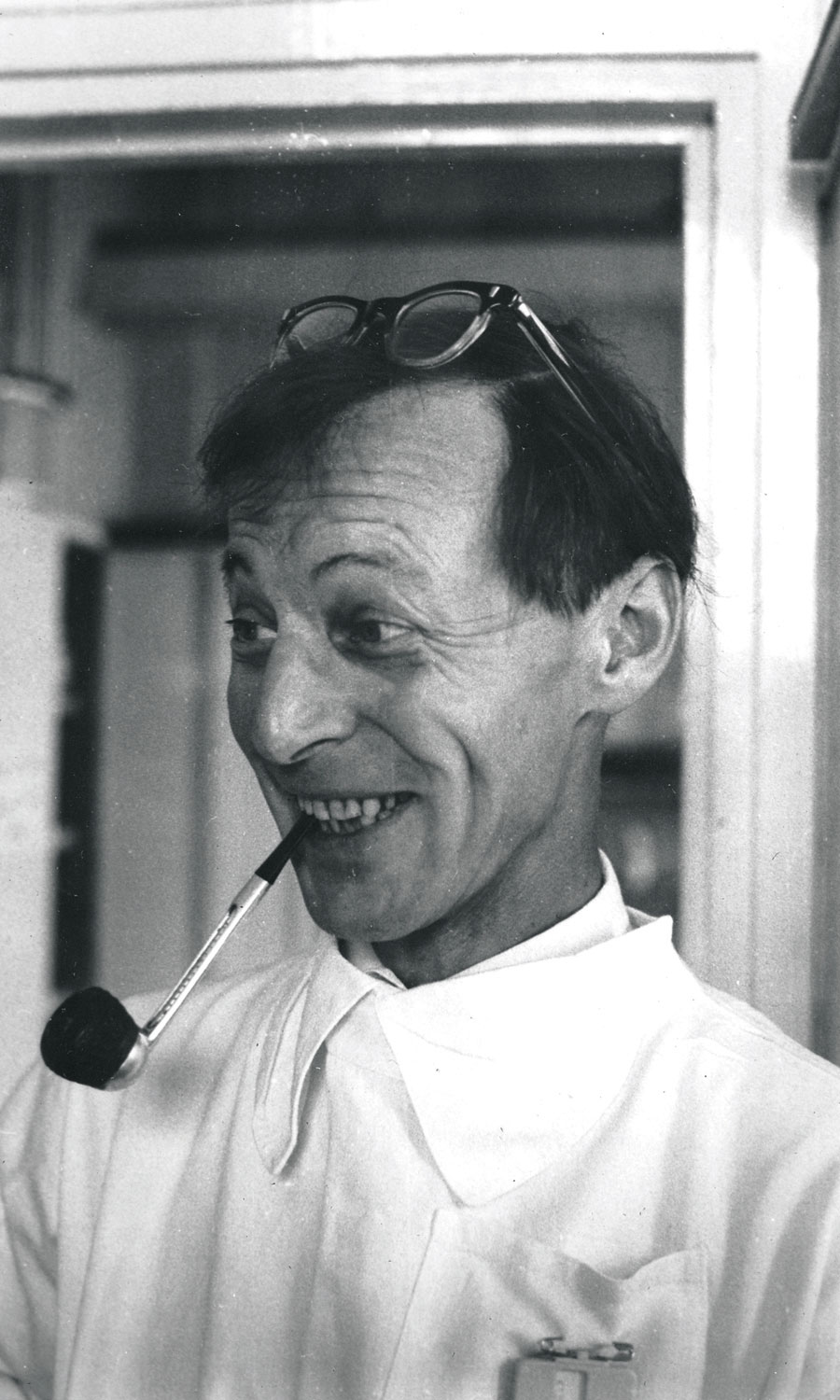
John H. Humphrey

- 2 December
  - Edward Barnsley, furniture designer (born 1900)
  - Peter Darrell, ballet dancer and choreographer, founder of the Scottish Ballet (born 1929)
  - George Wheatcroft, chess player (born 1905)
- 7 December
  - Robert Bean, Labour politician (born 1935)
  - Gareth Bennett, Anglican priest (born 1929; suicide)
  - Michael Crossley, World War II air ace (born 1912)
  - Helen Porter, botanist (born 1899)
- 9 December – Diana Forbes-Robertson, writer (born 1914)
- 14 December – Sir John Winterton, Army major-general (born 1898)
- 16 December
  - Helen Grimshaw, aeronautical engineer (born 1904)
  - John Russell, 4th Earl Russell, peer and son of Bertrand Russell (born 1921)
- 20 December
  - Bernard Hailstone, painter (born 1910)
  - Eric Harrison, Army major-general and athlete (born 1893)
  - Antony Hornby, businessman (born 1904)
- 22 December
  - Henry Cotton, golfer (born 1907)
  - Dorothy M. Needham, biochemist (born 1896)
  - Geoffrey Parsons, lyricist (born 1910)
- 24 December – Manoug Parikian, violinist (born 1920, Turkey)
- 25 December
  - John H. Humphrey, bacteriologist (born 1915)
  - Mick Shields, newspaper manager (born 1921)
- 26 December – Melford Stevenson, judge (born 1902)
- 27 December
  - John Astor, Conservative politician (born 1923)
  - James Holmes Hutchison, Scottish physician (born 1912)
  - Anthony West, author (born 1914)
- 28 December – John Hunt, Baron Hunt of Fawley, physician (born 1905)
- 29 December – Frank Llewellyn Harrison, musicologist (born 1905)
- 30 December – Theodore Zichy, actor, film director and producer (born 1908; suicide)

== See also ==
- 1987 in British music
- 1987 in British television
- List of British films of 1987
