= List of people from Kent =

This is a list of notable residents of the county of Kent in England who have a Wikipedia page. Persons are grouped by occupation and listed in order of birth. Kent is defined by its current boundaries.

== Academics, engineers and scientists ==
- Charles Culmer (c. 1300s) – supposedly built the fishermen's stairs which Broadstairs is named after
- William Caxton (c. 1420 – c. 1492) – first person to introduce a printing press into England
- Richard Knolles (c. 1545–1610) – Ottoman Empire historian
- Richard Baker (1568–1645) – historian
- Robert Fludd (1574–1637) – physicist and astrologer
- John Tradescant the elder (c. 1575–1638) – gardener and botanist
- John Tradescant the Younger (1608–1662) – gardener and botanist
- William Harvey (1578–1657) – anatomist
- John Wallis (1616–1703) – mathematician given partial credit for the development of modern calculus
- Robert Plot (1640–1696) – naturalist and Professor of Chemistry at the University of Oxford
- Stephen Gray (1666–1736) – physicist and astronomer
- Thomas Steers (1672–1750) – civil engineer and canal builder
- Stephen Hales (1677–1761) – physiologist and chemist
- George Sale (1697–1736) – Islamic studies scholar
- Thomas Bayes (c. 1702–1761) – mathematician and formulator of Bayes' theorem
- Edward Jacob – antiquary and naturalist
- Edward Nairne (1726–1806) – scientific instrument maker
- James Six (1731–1793) – meteorologist and inventor of the maximum minimum thermometer
- Catharine Macaulay (1731–1791) – historian
- Edward Hasted (1732–1812) – Kent historian
- Lionel Lukin (1742–1834) – possible inventor of the lifeboat
- William Congreve (1772–1828) – inventor and rocket pioneer
- Thomas Frederick Colby (1784–1852) – director of the Ordnance Survey
- Richard Jones (1790–1855) – economist
- Joshua Trimmer (1795–1857) – geologist
- John Stevens Henslow (1796–1861) – botanist and geologist
- Anna Atkins (1799–1871) – botanical photographer
- George Finlay (1799–1875) – Greek historian
- George Newport (1803–1854) – entomologist
- Robert Main (1808–1878) – astronomer
- Edmund Law Lushington (1811–1893) – Greek scholar and Rector of Glasgow University
- Joseph Prestwich (1812–1896) – geologist
- Edward Betts (1815–1872) – railway civil engineering contractor
- Thomas Russell Crampton (1816–1888) – engineer and designer of the Crampton locomotive
- Charles Kettle (1821–1862) – New Zealand town planner
- Joseph Lister, 1st Baron Lister (1827–1912) – surgeon and President of the Royal Society
- Nathaniel Barnaby (1829–1915) – Chief Constructor of the Royal Navy
- Edward James Reed (1830–1906) – Chief Constructor of the Royal Navy
- John Hulke (1830–1895) – surgeon and geologist
- Alexander Henry Green (1832–1896) – geologist
- Fleeming Jenkin (1833–1885) – Professor of Engineering at the University of Edinburgh
- Robinson Ellis (1834–1913) – Professor of Latin at Trinity College, Oxford
- James Holden (1837–1925) – locomotive engineer
- Frank Rutley (1842–1904) – geologist and petrographer
- William Robert Brooks (1844–1922) – American astronomer
- Henry George Smith (1852–1924) – chemist
- James Fletcher (1852–1908) – Canadian entomologist, botanist and writer
- Aubyn Trevor-Battye (1855–1922) – zoologist and writer
- Henry Watson Fowler (1858–1933) – lexicographer
- Alfred North Whitehead (1861–1947) – mathematician and philosopher
- Herbert Baker (1862–1946) – South Africa architect
- Baillie Scott (1865–1945) – architect
- Patrick Young Alexander (1867–1943) – aeronautical pioneer
- Frank Finn (1868–1932) – ornithologist
- Reginald Punnett (1875–1967) – geneticist and creator of the Punnett square
- William Sealy Gosset (1876–1937) – chemist and statistician
- Vita Sackville-West (1892–1962) – novelist, traveller and gardener
- Henry Tizard (1885–1959) – chemist and inventor
- John Edensor Littlewood (1885–1977) – mathematician
- Verena Holmes (1889–1964) – mechanical engineer and multi-field inventor
- Arthur Waley (1889–1966) – orientalist and sinologist
- Reg Balch (1894–1994) – ecologist and photographer
- Ralph Bagnold (1896–1990) – geologist, desert explorer, and soldier
- A. J. Arkell (1898–1980) – North African scholar
- Stanley Hooker (1907–1984) – jet engine engineer
- Simone Weil (1909–1943) – French philosopher and mystic
- Richard Beeching, Baron Beeching (1913–1985) – engineer and chairman of British Railways
- Maurice Lister (1914–2003) – chemist
- Sheila Sherlock (1918–2001) – physician and hepatologist
- George E. P. Box (1918–2001) – statistician
- John Aspinall (1926–2000) – zoo owner
- Peter Hemingway (1929–1995) – architect
- David Harvey (born 1935) – Professor of Anthropology at the City University of New York
- Michael Pearson (1936–2017) – expert on clocks and clock-making
- David L. Clarke (1937–1976) – archaeologist noted for his work on processual archaeology
- Diarmaid MacCulloch (born 1951) – Professor of 'the History of the Church' at the University of Oxford
- Daniel Tammet (born 1979) – autistic savant and record pi reciter
- Sonia Chadwick Hawkes (1933–1999) – archaeologist specialising in the early Middle Ages
- Alexandra Adams (1994/95-) – first deafblind doctor in the United Kingdom

== Actors ==
- Thomas Robson Brownhill (1821–1864) – theatre actor and comedian
- Ellen Ternan (1839–1914) – actress and mistress of Charles Dickens
- Francis Robert Benson (1858–1939) – actor and theatre manager
- Lilian Braithwaite (1873–1948) – actress and Dame Commander of the Order of the British Empire
- Sydney Greenstreet (1875–1954) – actor in films such as Casablanca and The Maltese Falcon
- Philip Hewland (1876–1953) – stage and film actor
- Victor McLaglen (1886–1956) – 1935 Academy Award winner for Best Actor
- Ballard Berkeley (1904–1988) – actor noted for his role as Major Gowen in TV's Fawlty Towers
- Margot Grahame (1911–1982) – actress in films such as The Informer and The Crimson Pirate
- Harry Andrews (1911–1989) – actor in films such as Superman and Watership Down
- Trevor Howard (1913–1988) – Academy Award nominated film actor
- Peter Cushing (1913–1994) – film actor of the Hammer Films, Star Wars and Dr Who and the Daleks
- Bob Todd (1922–1992) – comedy actor and sidekick of Benny Hill and Spike Milligan
- Hattie Jacques (1924–1980) – comedy actress of the Carry On films and TV's Sykes
- Frederick Treves (born 1925) – prolific TV actor
- Alec McCowen (1925–2017) – Golden Globe nominated film, theatre and TV actor
- Peter Barkworth (1929–2006) – BAFTA winning actor
- Dinsdale Landen (1932–2003) – TV actor
- Lance Percival (1933–2015) – comedy actor
- Patsy Byrne (1933–2014) – actress noted for her role as Nursie in TV's Blackadder II
- Tom Baker (born 1934) – actor in TV's Doctor Who and Little Britain
- Joanna Van Gyseghem (born 1941) – actress in TV's Duty Free and Rumpole of the Bailey
- Michael Crawford (born 1942) – Tony Award-winning comedy, film and musical actor
- Brenda Blethyn (born 1946) – Academy Award nominated actress
- Rusty Goffe (born 1948) – dwarf actor in the films Willy Wonka & the Chocolate Factory and Willow
- Fiona Reid (born 1951) – Canadian TV and film actress
- Mark Rylance (born 1960) – theatre actor
- Jack Dee (born 1962) – TV actor and comedian
- Martin Ball (born 1964) – theatre and TV actor
- Shaun Williamson (born 1964) – TV presenter and actor in TV's Eastenders
- Paul Ritter (1966–2021) – actor in TV's Friday Night Dinner, No Offence
- Tamsin Greig (born 1966) – actress in TV's Friday Night Dinner
- Naomi Watts (born 1968) – Academy Award nominated actress
- Matthew Holness (born c. 1968) – comedy writer and actor in TV's Garth Marenghi's Darkplace
- Ben Moor (born 1969) – comedy writer, and actor in TV's Fist of Fun
- Mackenzie Crook (born 1971) – actor in TV's The Office
- Shane Taylor (born 1973) – actor in TV's Band of Brothers
- Chris Simmons (born 1975) – actor in TV's The Bill
- Orlando Bloom (born 1977) – actor in the film series The Lord of the Rings and Pirates of the Caribbean
- Oliver Chris (born 1978) – actor in TV's Green Wing, The Office and Rescue Me
- Kevin Bishop (born 1980) – actor in the film Muppet Treasure Island and TV's Grange Hill
- Tom Riley (born 1981) – actor in TV's Da Vinci's Demons and The Nevers
- Gemma Arterton (born 1986) – actress
- Dominic Sherwood (born 1990) – actor in TV's Shadowhunters
- Joseph McManners (born 1992) – musical theatre actor and singer
- Tommy Knight (born 1993) – actor in TV's The Sarah Jane Adventures
- Jack Scanlon (born 1998) – TV and film actor
- Isaac Hempstead-Wright (born 1999) – actor in TV's Game of Thrones
- Hrvy (born 1999) – presenter from Friday Download

== Artists ==
- William Woollett (1735–1785) – engraver
- William Alexander (1767–1816) – painter and illustrator
- J. M. W. Turner (c. 1775–1851) – landscape painter
- Thomas Sidney Cooper (1803–1902) – painter
- Elizabeth Gould (1804–1902) – illustrator
- Samuel Palmer (1805–1881) – landscape painter
- Anne Pratt (1806–1893) – botanical and ornithological illustrator and author
- Richard Dadd (1817–1886) – painter
- John Hassall (1868–1948) – illustrator
- Mary Tourtel (1874–1948) – artist and creator of Rupert Bear
- Margaret Beale (1886–1969) – marine artist
- Colin Gill (1892–1940) – painter
- Hugh Cecil (1889–c. 1939) – photographer
- Compton Bennett (1900–1974) – film director and producer
- Tyrone Guthrie (1900–1971) – Tony Award-winning theatre director
- Don Potter (1902–2004) – sculptor
- Michael Powell (1905–1990) – film director
- Peter Rogers (1914–2009) – film producer of the Carry On series
- Oliver Postgate (1925–2008) – animator and co-creator of Bagpuss, The Clangers and Ivor the Engine
- Peter Firmin (1928–2018) – animator and co-creator of Basil Brush, Bagpuss and The Clangers
- Frank Auerbach (born 1931) – painter
- Peter Blake (born 1932) – pop artist, designer of the Sgt Pepper's Lonely Hearts Club Band album sleeve
- Mary Quant (born 1930) – fashion designer; inventor of the miniskirt and hot pants
- Antoinette Sibley (born 1939) – ballerina
- Zandra Rhodes (born 1940) – fashion designer
- Tim Page (born 1944) – Vietnam War photojournalist
- Roger Dean (born 1944) – album cover artist
- Dick Pope (born 1947) – cinematographer
- Bill Lewis (born 1953) – founder member of the Stuckists art group
- Mike Bernard (born 1957) – painter
- Gary Hume (born 1962) – painter
- Tracey Emin (born 1963) – Royal Academy artist
- Tacita Dean (born 1965) – visual artist
- Angus Fairhurst (born 1966) – photographic and visual artist
- Joe Machine (born 1973) – founder member of the Stuckists art group
- Remy Noe (born 1974) – founder member of the Stuckists art group
- George Henry Horton (born 1993) – filmmaker

== Clergy ==
- Laurence of Canterbury (?–619) – saint and the second Archbishop of Canterbury
- Paulinus of York (?–644) – first Bishop of York
- Edith of Wilton (961–984) – saint and illegitimate daughter of King Edgar the Peaceful
- William Addison (1883–1962) – recipient of the Victoria Cross
- Thomas Becket (c. 1118–1170) – saint and Archbishop of Canterbury
- John Kemp (c. 1380–1454) – Archbishop of Canterbury and Lord Chancellor
- John Morton (c. 1420–1500) – Archbishop of Canterbury and Lord Chancellor
- John Frith (1503–1533) – Protestant priest and writer, executed for heresy
- Roger Filcock (c. 1553–1601) – executed for preaching Catholicism
- Dudley Fenner (c. 1558–1587) – puritan theologian
- Edmund Duke (1563–1590) – martyr, executed for preaching Catholicism
- Richard Clarke (?–1634) – Anglican scholar and preacher
- John Lothropp (1584–1653) – Anglican minister and founder of Barnstable, Massachusetts
- Robert Abbot (c. 1588–c. 1662) – Puritan theologian
- Peter Gunning (1614–1684) – Royalist and Bishop of Chichester
- William Wall (1647–1728) – Anglican theologian
- White Kennett (1660–1728) – Bishop of Peterborough
- Nathanial Lardner (1684–1768) – theologian
- Edward Perronet (1726–1792) – Anglican preacher
- George Horne (1730–1792) – Bishop of Norwich
- Charles Thomas Longley (1794–1868) – Archbishop of Canterbury
- Henry Edward Manning (1808–1892) – cardinal
- Alfred Saker (1814–1880) – Baptist missionary
- George Hills (1816–1895) – Bishop of British Columbia
- Christopher Newman Hall (1816–1902) – Anglican abolitionist
- John R. Winder (1821–1910) – leader of The Church of Jesus Christ of Latter-day Saints
- Edward King (1829–1910) – Anglican bishop
- John Young Stratton (1829/30–1905) – Anglican clergyman, author and social reformer who campaigned to improve conditions for farm labourers and hop-pickers.
- E. W. Bullinger (1837–1913) – Anglican clergyman, Biblical scholar, and dispensationalist theologian
- Arthur Tooth (1839–1931) – Anglican clergyman, prosecuted under the Public Worship Regulation Act 1874
- John Neale Dalton (1839–1931) – chaplain to Queen Victoria and tutor to George V of the United Kingdom
- Charles Bousfield Huleatt (1863–1908) – Anglican priest and discoverer of the Magdalen papyrus
- Nelson Wellesley Fogarty (1871–1933) – Bishop of Damaraland, Namibia
- Frank W. Boreham (1871–1959) – Baptist theologian
- Edward Knapp-Fisher (1915–2003) – Sub-Dean of Westminster Abbey
- John A. T. Robinson (1919–1983) – Bishop of Woolwich

== Entrepreneurs ==
- William Adams (1564–1620) – trader and first British navigator to reach Japan
- William Claiborne (c. 1600-c. 1677) – early settler of Virginia and Maryland
- Christopher Branch (c. 1600–1682) – early settler of Virginia
- Thomas Fairfax, 6th Lord Fairfax of Cameron (1693–1781) – landowner in Virginia
- William Colgate (1783–1857) – founder of the Colgate toothpaste company
- Gregory Blaxland (1788–1852) – settler of Australia and wine-maker
- Thomas Fletcher Waghorn (1800–1850) – postal pioneer who developed a new route from Great Britain to India
- Darrell Duppa (1832–1892) – co-founder of Phoenix, Arizona
- Edward William Cole (1832–1918) – successful bookshop owner in Melbourne, Australia
- Charles Elkin Mathews (1851–1921) – publisher and bookseller
- George Marchant (1857–1941) – soft-drink manufacturer in Australia
- Bronson Albery (1881–1971) – theatre director and impresario
- Freddie Laker (1922–2006) – founder of Laker Airways
- Michael Farmer, Baron Farmer (born 1944) - businessman and life peer in the House of Lords
- Ian Davis (born 1952) – Managing Director of McKinsey & Company
- John Charman (born 1953) – CEO/President/Director of Bermuda-based Axis Capital Holdings Ltd

== Musicians ==
- John Ward (1571–1638) – composer
- John Jenkins (1592–1678) – composer
- John Gostling (1644–1733) – bass singer and a favourite of Charles II of England
- Isaac Nathan (c. 1792–1864) – English-Australian musician
- George Job Elvey (1816–1993) – organist and composer
- Sydney Nicholson (1875–1947) – founder of the Royal School of Church Music
- Edward Norman Hay (1889–1943) – composer and musicologist
- Malcolm Sargent (1895–1967) – leading conductor of choral works
- Percy Whitlock (1903–1946) – organist and composer
- Roy Douglas (born 1907) – composer
- Alfred Deller (1912–1979) – opera singer
- Daphne Oram (1925–2003) – composer and electronic musician
- Tony Coe (born 1934) – jazz musician
- Bill Wyman (born 1936) – bassist for the band The Rolling Stones
- Richard Rodney Bennett (1936–2012) – film score and jazz composer
- Crispian St. Peters (1939–2010) – pop singer
- Mick Jagger (born 1943) – singer and songwriter for the band The Rolling Stones
- Keith Richards (born 1943) – guitarist and songwriter for the band The Rolling Stones
- Dick Taylor (born 1943) – bassist for the band The Rolling Stones
- Mike Ratledge (born 1943) – keyboardist for the band Soft Machine
- Phil May (born 1944) – singer for the band The Pretty Things
- Kevin Ayers (born 1944) – singer and bassist for the band Soft Machine
- Judge Dread (1945–1998) – reggae and ska artist
- Hugh Hopper (born 1945) – progressive rock and jazz bass guitarist and composer
- Noel Redding (1945–2003) – bassist for the band The Jimi Hendrix Experience
- John Paul Jones (born 1946) – bassist, keyboardist and co-songwriter for English rock band Led Zeppelin
- Trevor Pinnock (born 1946) – conductor and harpsichordist
- Richard Coughlan (born 1947) – drummer for the band Caravan
- Dave Sinclair (born 1947) – keyboardist for the band Caravan
- Gordon Giltrap (born 1948) – guitarist and composer
- Richard Sinclair (born 1948) – guitarist for the band Caravan
- Bill Bruford (born 1949) – drummer for the bands Yes and King Crimson
- Nigel Egg (born 1949) – singer/songwriter
- Peter Frampton (born 1950) – musician, most famous for Frampton Comes Alive!
- Alan Clayson (born 1951) – record producer and songwriter
- Harry Christophers (born 1953) – conductor
- David Wright (born 1953) – New Age keyboard player and composer
- Gary Barden (born 1955) – songwriter and guitarist for the band Michael Schenker Group
- Anne Dudley (born 1956) – orchestral composer and pop musician
- Sid Vicious (1957–1979) – bassist for the band The Sex Pistols
- Shane MacGowan (1957–2023) – singer and songwriter for the band The Pogues
- Kate Bush (born 1958) – pop musician
- Billy Childish (born 1959) – singer, guitarist, artist and poet
- Pete Tong (born 1960) – record producer and DJ for BBC Radio 1
- Guy Fletcher (born 1960) – keyboardist for the band Dire Straits
- Boy George (born 1961) – singer with the band Culture Club
- Sexton Ming (born 1961) – musician, artist and poet
- Andrew Giddings (born 1963) – keyboardist for the band Jethro Tull
- Paul Oakenfold (born 1963) – record producer and DJ
- Nitin Sawhney (born 1964) – songwriter and record producer
- Jay Darlington (born 1968) – keyboardist for the band Kula Shaker
- Omar Lye-Fook (born 1968) – soul singer, songwriter and musician
- Justin Chancellor (born 1971) – bass player for the rock band Tool
- Richard Hughes (born 1975) – drummer for the band Keane
- Tom Perchard (born 1976) – musicologist
- David Ford (born 1978) – singer-songwriter
- Vicky Beeching (born 1979) – worship leader and musician
- Ben Mills (born 1980) – singer and contestant on TV's The X Factor
- Rik Waller (born 1980) – singer and contestant on TV's Pop Idol
- Lee Ryan (born 1983) – member of the boy band Blue
- Oliver Sykes (born 1986) – metal singer
- Joss Stone (born 1987) – BRIT and Grammy Award-winning R&B singer/songwriter
- Declan Galbraith (born 1991) – singer
- Mimi Webb (born 2000) – pop singer and songwriter
- PinkPantheress (born 2001) – pop musician

== Politicians, statesmen and lawyers ==
- Charles Abbott, 1st Baron Tenterden (1762–1832) – Lord Chief Justice
- Aretas Akers-Douglas, 1st Viscount Chilston (1851–1926) – Conservative Home Secretary
- Jeffrey Amherst, 1st Baron Amherst (1717–1797) – Governor General of British North America
- Josceline Amherst (1846–1900) – member of Western Australia's first Legislative Council under responsible government
- Richard Ash Kingsford (1821–1902) – alderman and mayor of Brisbane Municipal Council, a Member of the Legislative Assembly of Queensland, Australia, and a mayor of Cairns, Queensland
- Bob Astles (1924–2012) – associate of Ugandan presidents Milton Obote and Idi Amin
- Wallace Bickley (1810–1876) – early settler of Western Australia and Member of the Western Australian Legislative Council
- Anne Boleyn (c. 1501–1536) – wife of King Henry VIII
- Francis Bond Head (1793–1875) – Lieutenant-Governor of Upper Canada during the rebellion of 1837
- Jonathan Bowden (1962–2012) – writer and political theorist
- Richard Boyle, 1st Earl of Cork (1566–1643) – Lord High Treasurer of the Kingdom of Ireland
- Audrey Callaghan (1915–2005) – Greater London Councillor and wife of Prime Minister James Callaghan
- Thomas Cheney (c. 1485–1558) – Lord Warden of the Cinque Ports
- Martin Conway, 1st Baron Conway of Allington (1856–1937) – Member of Parliament and art critic
- Nicky Crane (1958–1993) – neo-Nazi activist
- Sackville Crowe (c. 1611 – c. 1683) – Member of Parliament and Ambassador to the Ottoman Empire
- Heneage Finch, 1st Earl of Nottingham (1621–1682) – Lord Chancellor
- Sir John Peyton (died 1558) – Governor of Jersey
- John Scott of Scott's Hall (died 1485) – Lord Warden of the Cinque Ports
- William Scott of Scott's Hall (died 1524) – Lord Warden of the Cinque Ports
- Miles Sindercombe (died 1657) – leader of a group that tried to assassinate Oliver Cromwell
- Henry Stafford, 1st Baron Stafford (1501–1563) – peer
- Roger Twysden (1597–1672) – politician and antiquarian
- James Weaver (1800–1886) – Wisconsin State Assemblyman
- Sophie, Duchess of Edinburgh (Sophie, born 1965) – wife of Prince Edward, Duke of Edinburgh
- Nicholas Wotton (c. 1497–1567) – ambassador to France
- Philip Yorke, 1st Earl of Hardwicke (1690–1764) – Lord Chancellor
- Henry Young (1808–1870) – fifth Governor of South Australia
- Thomas Hinckley, (Tenterden, Kent, England; (1618–1706) – Governor Plymouth Colonies (1680–1692)
- Francis Lovelace (1621–1675) – second governor of the New York colony
- Daniel Horsmanden (c. 1691 – c. 1778) – judge who tried the supposed conspirators in the New York Slave Insurrection of 1741
- Thomas Paine (1737–1809) – revolutionary
- Charles Larkin (1775–1833) – electoral reformer
- Elizabeth Fry (1780–1845) – prison reformer
- Sir Edward Knatchbull, 9th Baronet (1781–1849) – Conservative Member of Parliament for East Kent
- George Gipps (1791–1847) – Governor of the colony of New South Wales, Australia
- William Locke Brockman (1802–1872) – early settler of Western Australia and Member of the Western Australian Legislative Council
- Edmund Walker Head (1805–1868) – Governor General of the Province of Canada
- Charles Sladen (1816–1884) – sixth Premier of Victoria, Australia
- Edith Pechey (1845–1908) – suffragette and one of the first UK female doctors
- George Herbert Murray (1849–1936) – civil servant and Permanent Secretary of the Treasury
- William Hall-Jones (1851–1936) – Prime Minister of New Zealand
- Janet Stancomb-Wills (1851–1932) – mayor of Ramsgate and philanthropist
- Henry Forster, 1st Baron Forster (1866–1936) – seventh Governor-General of Australia
- Grote Stirling (1875–1953) – Member of Parliament in Canada
- Wendy Wood (1892–1981) – campaigner for Scottish independence
- Philip Lucock (1916–1996) – Deputy Speaker of the House of Representatives in Australia
- Edward Heath (1916–2005) – Prime Minister of the United Kingdom
- Ron Ledger (1920–2004) – Labour Member of Parliament
- John Vinelott (1923–2006) – High Court judge
- Jeanne Hoban (1924–1997) – trade unionist in Sri Lanka
- Geoff Braybrooke (1935–2013) – New Zealand Member of Parliament
- Michael Farmer, Baron Farmer (born 1944) - businessman and life peer in the House of Lords
- Brian Haw (1949–2011) – anti-war protester
- Anne, Princess Royal (Anne; born 1950) – only daughter of Elizabeth II
- Nick Brown (born 1950) – Labour Member of Parliament
- John Redwood (born 1951) – Conservative Member of Parliament
- James Arbuthnot (born 1952) – Conservative Member of Parliament
- Paul Clark (born 1957) – Labour Member of Parliament
- Sean Gabb (born 1960) – director of the free market and civil liberties think-tank, Libertarian Alliance
- Nigel Farage (born 1964) – leader of the UK Independence Party (UKIP)

== Presenters and entertainers ==
- Kenneth Clark (1903–1983) – art historian and TV presenter
- Frank Muir (1920–1998) – comedy writer and TV presenter
- Michael Bentine (1922–1996) – comedian and member of the Goons
- Tony Hart (1925–2009) – artist and children's TV presenter
- Bob Holness (1928–2011) – presenter of TV's Blockbusters and Call My Bluff
- Rod Hull (1935–1999) – TV entertainer, known for his puppet Emu
- David Frost (1939–2013) – TV presenter, satirist and journalist
- Jan Leeming (born 1942) – TV presenter and newsreader
- Roger Day (born 1945) – radio presenter for BBC Radio Kent
- David Starkey (born 1945) – historian and TV presenter
- Reg Bolton (1945–2006) – circus clown and writer
- Michael Hogben (born 1952) – antiques dealer and presenter of TV's Auction Man
- Jilly Goolden (born 1956) – wine critic and TV presenter
- Lorraine Michaels (born 1958) – Playboy magazine's Playmate of the Month for April 1981
- Carol McGiffin (born 1960) – radio presenter and panellist on TV's Loose Women
- Ian Hislop (born 1960) – TV presenter and editor of Private Eye magazine
- Fiona Phillips (born 1961) – presenter of TV's GMTV
- Mark Steel (born 1960) – socialist comedian and newspaper columnist
- Anton Vamplew (born 1966) – astronomer and TV presenter
- Nick Bateman (born 1967) – Big Brother contestant, TV presenter and writer
- Nicki Chapman (born 1967) – TV presenter and judge on TV's Popstars and Pop Idol
- Naomi Cleaver (born 1967) – interior designer and presenter of TV's Other People's Houses and Honey I Ruined the House
- David Bull (born 1969) – doctor and guest on TV's Most Haunted Live, The Wright Stuff and Watchdog
- Alistair Appleton (born 1970) – presenter of TV's Cash in the Attic and House Doctor
- Melanie and Martina Grant (born 1971) – presenters of TV's Fun House
- Alex Lovell (born 1973) – presenter of TV's Playhouse Disney and BrainTeaser
- James Tanner (born c. 1976) – chef on TV's Ready Steady Cook
- Luke Burrage (born 1976) – juggler
- Matt Morgan (born 1977) – co-host of Russell Brand's BBC Radio 2 show
- Kelly Brook (born 1979) – model, actress and TV presenter

== Soldiers ==
- Francis Thynne (c. 1544–1608) – officer of arms at the College of Arms, London
- Samuel Argall (1580–1608) – Navy admiral and kidnapper of Pocahontas
- Sir William Brockman (1595–1654) – politician and military leader during the English civil war
- John Boys (1607–1664) – Royalist captain during the English Civil War
- George Rooke (1650–1709) – naval commander during the Dutch Wars
- George Byng, 1st Viscount Torrington (1663–1733) – First Lord of the Admiralty
- Charles Middleton, 1st Baron Barham (1726–1813) – First Lord of the Admiralty
- James Wolfe (1727–1759) – military officer who defeated the French and established British rule in Canada
- Charles Cornwallis, 1st Marquess Cornwallis (1738–1805) – British general in the American War of Independence
- Peter Rainier (1741–1808) – Royal Navy Admiral and Member of Parliament
- John Nicholson Inglefield (1748–1828) – Royal Navy Captain of the Fleet
- Arthur Wellesley, 1st Duke of Wellington (1769–1852) – field marshal and Prime Minister of the United Kingdom
- Henry Hardinge, 1st Viscount Hardinge (1785–1856) – field marshal and Governor-General of India
- James Mouat (1815–1899) – recipient of the Victoria Cross
- John Miller Adye (1819–1900) – general
- William Sutton (1830–1888) – recipient of the Victoria Cross
- George Truman Morrell (1830–1912) – Royal Navy commander
- John French, 1st Earl of Ypres (1852–1925) – World War I field marshal
- Harold Stephen Langhorne (1866–1932) – brigadier-general
- Alexander Godley (1867–1957) – World War I general
- Henry Edward Manning Douglas (1875–1939) – recipient of the Victoria Cross
- Arthur Borton (1883–1933) – recipient of the Victoria Cross
- Thomas Highgate (1895–1914) – first British soldier to be convicted of desertion and executed during World War I
- James McCudden (1895–1918) – recipient of the Victoria Cross
- Dick White (1906–1993) – Head of the Secret Intelligence Service
- Charles Henry Pepys Harington (1910–2007) – general
- Roderick Alastair Brook Learoyd (1913–1996) – recipient of the Victoria Cross
- Peter Allen Norton (born 1962) – awarded the George Cross for his service in Iraq
- Sarah-Jayne Mulvihill (1973–2006) – Flight lieutenant in the Royal Air Force killed in Iraq

== Sportsmen ==
- Edwin Head (1701–1735) – noted cricket patron and team captain in the 1720s and early 1730s
- George Louch (1746–1811) – cricketer
- Robert Clifford (1752–1811) – cricketer for Kent
- Fuller Pilch (1804–1870) – cricketer for Kent and Norfolk
- Henry Tracey Coxwell (1819–1900) – balloonist
- H T Waghorn (1842–1930) – cricket statistician and historian
- Spencer Gore (1850–1906) – first Wimbledon tennis champion
- Cuthbert Ottaway (1850–1878) – England football captain
- Frank Marchant (1864–1946) – cricketer for Kent
- Fred Waghorne (1866–1956) – ice hockey referee in Canada
- Douglas Carr (1872–1950) – cricketer for Kent and England
- Syd King (1873–1932) – footballer and manager of West Ham United
- Archie Cross (1881–unknown) – footballer for Woolwich Arsenal
- Edward Walter Solly (1882–1966) – cricketer for Worcestershire
- Frank Woolley (1887–1978) - cricketer for Kent and England
- Walter Tull (1888–1918) – UK's second black professional footballer and first black infantry officer
- John Stanton Fleming Morrison (1892–1961) – golf course architect
- Louis Zborowski (1895–1924) – racing driver
- Wally Hammond (1903–1965) – cricketer for Gloucestershire and England
- Dick Edmed (1904–1983) – footballer for Liverpool
- Les Ames (1905–1990) – cricketer for Kent and England
- Alec Rose (1908–1991) – sailed single-handed around the world
- Hopper Levett (1908–1995) – cricketer for England
- Art Potter (1909–1998) – Canadian ice hockey administrator
- Sam King (1911–2003) – golfer
- Arthur Fagg (1915–1977) – cricketer for Kent and England
- William Murray-Wood (1917–1968) – cricketer for Kent
- Jack Conley (1920–1991) – footballer for Torquay United
- Godfrey Evans (1920–1999) – cricketer for Kent and England
- Ted Ditchburn (1921–2005) – footballer for Tottenham Hotspur and England
- Malcolm Allison (1927–2010) – footballer for West Ham United and football manager
- Colin Cowdrey (1932–2000) – cricketer for Kent and England
- Brian Moore (1932–2001) – TV sports commentator
- George Wright (1930–1992) – footballer for West Ham United
- Brian Luckhurst (1939–2005) – cricketer for Kent and England
- Mike Denness (1940–2013) – cricketer for Kent and England
- Barry Davies (born 1940) – TV sports commentator
- Bill Ivy (1942–1969) – motorcycle racer
- John Shepherd (born 1943) – cricketer for Kent and West Indies
- Asif Iqbal (born 1943) – cricketer for Kent and Pakistan
- Alan Ealham (born 1944) – cricketer for Kent
- Derek Underwood (1945–2024) – cricketer for Kent and England
- Alan Knott (born 1946) – cricketer for Kent and England
- Bob Woolmer (1948–2007) – cricketer for Kent and England
- Brian Rose (born 1950) – cricketer for Somerset and England
- Bernard Julien (1950–2025) – cricketer for Kent and West Indies
- Paul Gilchrist (born 1952) – footballer for Southampton, Portsmouth and Swindon Town
- Kevin Jarvis (born 1953) – cricketer for Kent and Gloucestershire
- Tony Godden (born 1955) – footballer for West Bromwich Albion, Chelsea and Birmingham City
- Dave Carr (1957–2005) – footballer for Luton Town and Torquay United
- David Gower (born 1957) – England cricket captain and TV presenter
- Bob Bolder (born 1958) – footballer for Charlton Athletic, Sunderland and Sheffield Wednesday
- Graham Dilley (1959–2011) – cricketer for Kent and England
- Richard Ellison (born 1959) – cricketer for Kent and England
- Barry Knight (born 1960) – football referee
- Steve Bennett (born 1961) – football referee
- Gary Brazil (born 1962) – footballer for Fulham, Preston North End and Sheffield United
- Jamie Spence (born 1963) – golfer
- Andy Townsend (born 1963) – TV presenter; footballer for Aston Villa and Republic of Ireland
- David Bowman (born 1964) – footballer for Heart of Midlothian, Dundee United and Scotland
- Geoff Parsons (born 1964) – Commonwealth Games silver medal-winning high jumper
- Tim Berrett (born 1965) – Canadian Olympic race walker
- Andy Hessenthaler (born 1965) – footballer and manager of Gillingham
- Mark Ealham (born 1969) – cricketer for Nottinghamshire and England
- Nigel Llong (born 1969) – cricketer for Kent
- Doug Loft (born 1986) – footballer
- Kelly Holmes (born 1970) – 800 metres and 1500 metres Olympic gold medalist
- Mark Hammett (born 1972) – rugby union footballer for New Zealand
- Rob Short (born 1972) – field hockey player for Canada
- Jamie Staff (born 1973) – Commonwealth Games medal winning cyclist
- Gary Breen (born 1973) – footballer for Coventry City, Sunderland and Republic of Ireland
- Neil Shipperley (born 1974) – footballer for Crystal Palace, Chelsea and Wimbledon
- Takaloo (born 1975) – Iranian boxer
- Matthew Rose (born 1975) – footballer for Arsenal, QPR and Yeovil Town
- Kevin Hunt (born 1975) – footballer for Gillingham, Hong Kong Rangers and Bohemians FC
- Ed Smith (born 1977) – writer, and cricketer for Kent and England
- Georgina Harland (born 1978) – 2004 Olympic bronze medallist in the Modern pentathlon
- Peter Hawkins (born 1978) – footballer for Wimbledon, York City and Rushden & Diamonds
- Jon Harley (born 1979) – footballer for Sheffield United, Fulham and Chelsea
- David Flatman (born 1980) – rugby union footballer for Bath and England
- Michael Yardy (born 1980) – cricketer for Sussex
- Sarah Ayton (born 1980) – Olympic gold medal-winning sailor
- Gary Mills (born 1981) – footballer for Rushden & Diamonds
- Danny Spiller (born 1981) – footballer for Gillingham
- Richard Rose (born 1982) – footballer for Gillingham and Hereford United
- James Tredwell (born 1982) – cricketer for Kent and England
- Rhys Lloyd (born 1982) – American footballer for Frankfurt Galaxy
- Lisa Dobriskey (born 1983) – Commonwealth Games 1500 metres gold medallist
- Billy Jones (born 1983) – footballer for Leyton Orient and Kidderminster
- Barry Fuller (born 1984) – footballer for Barnet and Stevenage
- Adam Birchall (born 1984) – footballer for Mansfield Town, Barnet and Wales Under–21s
- Andrew Crofts (born 1984) – footballer for Gillingham
- Dave Martin (born 1985) – footballer for Crystal Palace
- Tom Varndell (born 1985) – rugby union footballer for Leicester Tigers and England
- Joe Denly (born 1986) – cricketer for Kent and England
- Sammy Moore (born 1987) – footballer for Ipswich Town
- Zack Sabre Jr (born 1987) – professional wrestler
- Chris Smalling (born 1989) – footballer with Manchester United F.C.
- Adrian Quaife-Hobbs (born 1991) – Formula BMW racing driver
- Luis Binks (born 2001) - Footballer

== Writers ==
- Edwin Arnold (1832–1904) – poet and journalist
- Edwin Lester Arnold (1857–1935) – author
- Alfred Austin (1835–1913) – Poet Laureate
- Enid Bagnold (1889–1981) – author and playwright
- Rachel Beer (1858–1927) – editor of The Observer and The Sunday Times newspapers
- Aphra Behn (1640–1689) – dramatist among earliest professional female writers
- Robert Blatchford (1851–1943) – socialist author
- Daniel Blythe (born 1969) – author
- Robert Bridges (1844–1930) – Poet Laureate
- Michael Busselle (1935–2006) – writer and photographer
- Elizabeth Carter (1717–1806) – linguist
- Geoffrey Chaucer (c. 1343–1400) – diplomat and author of The Canterbury Tales
- Joseph Conrad (1857–1924) – novelist
- Caroline Cornwallis (1786–1858)
- Arthur Shearly Cripps (1869–1952) – poet, writer and Anglican priest
- Rana Dasgupta (born 1971) – writer
- Charles Dickens (1812–1870) – foremost Victorian novelist
- Sarah Dixon (1671/2 – 1765) – poet
- Keith Douglas (1920–1944) – poet
- David Edwards (born 1962) – political journalist
- Ernest Elmore (1901–1957) – writer of fantasy and (as John Bude) crime novels
- U. A. Fanthorpe (1929–2009) – poet and recipient of the Queen's gold medal for Poetry
- Anne Finch, Countess of Winchilsea (1661–1720) – poet
- Robert Fisk (1946–2020) – journalist
- Phineas Fletcher (1582–1650) – poet
- Frederick Forsyth (born 1938) – author of thriller novels such as The Day of the Jackal and The Odessa File
- Caroline Fry (1787–1846) – Christian writer
- John Fuller (born 1937) – poet and author
- John Gillespie Magee, Jr. (1922–1943) – Air Force pilot and poet
- John Gower (c. 1330–1408) – poet
- Thom Gunn (1929–2004) – Anglo-American poet
- Christopher Harte (born 1947) - sports writer and bibliographer
- William Hazlitt (1778–1830) – essayist and literary critic
- Thomas Head Raddall (1903–1994) – historical fiction writer
- David Hewson (born 1953) – crime and mystery novelist
- Robert Holdstock (born 1948) – fantasy author
- M. R. James (1862–1936) – mediaeval scholar and author
- Lionel Johnson (1867–1902) – poet, essayist and critic
- Sidney Keyes (1922–1943) – war poet
- Winifred Mary Letts (1882–1972) – novelist and poet
- Richard Lovelace (1618–1659) – poet and Royalist
- John Lyly (c. 1553–1606) – writer and originator of the linguistic style Euphuism
- John Lloyd (born 1951) – comedy writer, and TV producer for Blackadder, Spitting Image and Not the Nine O'Clock News
- Christopher Marlowe (1564–1593) – dramatist, poet and translator
- Ronald James Marsh (1914–1987) – novelist
- E. Nesbit (1858–1924) – children's author and poet
- William Nicholson (born 1948) – Academy Award nominated screenwriter, playwright, and novelist
- Alice Oseman (born 1996) – author
- William Painter (1540–1594) – author
- James Parton (1822–1891) – American biographer
- Stel Pavlou (born 1970) – author and screenwriter
- Mervyn Peake (1911–1968) – author of the Gormenghast books
- Edward Plunkett, 18th Baron Dunsany (1878–1957) – writer and dramatist
- Dudley Pope (1925–1997) – author of nautical fiction
- Peter Quennell (1905–1993) – poet and literary historian
- Bruce Robinson (born 1946) – BAFTA award-winning screenwriter
- George W. M. Reynolds (1814–1879) – author
- William Pett Ridge (1857–1930) – author
- Sarah Sands (born 1961) – editor of The Sunday Telegraph newspaper
- Siegfried Sassoon (1886–1967) – war poet
- Philip Sidney (1554–1606) – poet and military general
- Christopher Smart (1722–1771) – poet
- Robert Smythe Hichens (1864–1950) – journalist and novelist
- W. Somerset Maugham (1874–1965) – playwright and novelist
- David Lee Stone (born 1978) – fantasy author
- John Russell Taylor (born 1938) – film critic
- Russell Thorndike (1885–1972) – novelist and actor
- Thomas Turner (1729–1793) – diarist
- Gilbert Waterhouse (1883–1916) – war poet
- H. G. Wells (1866–1946) – writer
- John Wells (1936–1998) – satirical writer and comedy performer
- Norman Worker (1927–2005) – comic book writer
- Thomas Wyatt (1503–1400) – poet and diplomat
- Dornford Yates (1885–1960) – novelist

== Miscellaneous ==
- Elizabeth Barton (1506–1534) - Catholic nun executed by Henry VIII
- Mary Carleton (1642–1673) – fraudster
- Mary and Eliza Chulkhurst (1100–1134) – one of the earliest known sets of conjoined twins
- Kevin Foster (born 1958/59) – investment fraudster
- Frank John William Goldsmith (1902–1982) – survivor of the RMS Titanic disaster
- Tony Hayward (born 1957) – CEO of BP Group (2007–2010)
- Alice Liddell (1852–1934) – inspiration for Alice's Adventures in Wonderland
- Marcus Sarjeant (born 1964) – fired six blank shots at Elizabeth II
- Sophia Stacey (1791–1874) – friend of poet Percy Bysshe Shelley and writer Mary Shelley
- Walter Tirel (1065–1134) – killed William II of England, possibly accidentally
- John Ward (c. 1553–1622) – pirate

== See also ==
People of London boroughs from historic Kent:

- Bexley
- Bromley
- Greenwich
- Lewisham
