= Kitty Empire =

British writer and music critic (born 1970)

- Born: 1970 (age 55–56); Montreal, Quebec, Canada
- Occupations: Writer; journalist

Kitty Empire (born 1970) is a British writer and music critic. As of 2026 she writes for The Observer.

== Early life ==
Empire says that she was born in Montreal, Quebec, in 1970 and brought up in Canada, Italy and Egypt before arriving in Britain in 1988. She studied at Wadham College, Oxford, and Thames Valley University before working as a stage door-keeper for the Royal Shakespeare Company and London's Barbican Theatre. Empire describes herself as a feminist.

== Career ==
Empire began writing about music at the NME in 1995, continuing for seven years. In 2002, she became pop critic for The Observer. She has also contributed to a variety of publications and broadcasts such as Elle (US), GQ, Radio 4's Woman's Hour, Newsnight Review, Uncut and The Scotsman. In 2008, she served as a judge for the Mercury Music Prize and she is a guest judge for the 2022 Observer / Anthony Burgess Prize for Arts Journalism. Empire also featured on 5Live, BBC 6Music, and BBC2's The Culture Show and Newsnight Review.

== Critical reception ==
Writing in Cambridge University's Popular Music journal, Devon Powers and Tom Perchard describe Empire as "one of the UK's comparatively few broadsheet pop critics, and one of the most insightful." Jennifer Skellington notes that Empire's reviewing style focuses as much upon the artists as their art, and reflects a trend towards "a less conservative approach to rock- and pop-related writing" in the quality press. Educator Mary Hogarth praises Empire's "show, don't tell" approach to writing, her pacing, and her balance of description, perspective, and first-hand experience.
