= Perchard =

Perchard is a surname. Notable people with the surname include:

- Charles Perchard (born 1992), Jersey cricketer
- Jim Perchard (born 1957), Jersey politician
- Peter Perchard (c. 1729–1806), British goldsmith and merchant
- Tom Perchard (born 1976), British writer and musicologist
