= Kevin Foster (fraudster) =

- Born: 1958/1959; Doddington, Kent, England
- Occupations: Former cab driver, gambler, investment scheme operator
- Known for: KF Concept Ponzi scheme
- Convictions: Theft and deception relating to investment schemes
- Penalty: 10 years imprisonment

Kevin Foster (born 1958/1959) is an English investment fraudster, convicted of 14 counts of deception and theft in relation to his operation of a £34m (approx $51m) Ponzi scheme, which ran from 2002 to 2004.

By the time Foster was stopped, police discovered his scheme, originally called KF Concept but later renamed to Phase 9, had taken money from 8,500 investors, mainly drawn in through his series of flamboyant roadshows across the UK.

In 2010, Foster was sentenced to 10 years imprisonment, though that was reduced to 9 years on appeal after several convictions were overturned.

== History ==
Foster's investing career started in 2001 with a football betting scheme, taking stakes from his colleagues, promising them a fivefold return on their money, and encouraging participants to roll over their winnings and invest further in his next scheme. From there, he expanded his scheme, named it KF Concept in 2002, and launched a series of roadshows in England, Wales and Scotland.

The roadshows were flamboyant, with Foster appearing on stage backed by music, often ABBA's Money, Money, Money, presenting himself as a gambling expert who could deliver great profits to his investors from betting on soccer and horse racing. Foster claimed that for every £1 invested, he was earning £28.50, that he had already recruited 50,000 members, and that the scheme held assets of £203m.

The highlight of Foster's presentations came when previous investors' names were drawn by lottery, with the lucky winners being paid their promised returns early, in front of the crowd. Further prizes included cars, and even the loan of Foster's Ferrari.

This show of money satisfied the doubts of many investors, who weren't aware that, in classic Ponzi style, it was being paid out of new investors' deposits rather than from any profits from the scheme. At least 8,000 people were drawn in, investing a minimum of £1,000, with an estimated average of £4,200 each.

In 2003, Foster dropped the name KF Concept after negative publicity, renaming the scheme Phase 9.

== Investigation ==
In January 2004, the Kent Police, together with the Financial Services Authority, investigated Foster's investment affairs, and the following month halted his activities, discovering that by that time he had collected a total of £34m from more than 8,500 investors. The money that Foster had claimed his scheme controlled was not there, and he had made no profits from any gambling activities. A freezing order was obtained, and Foster was declared bankrupt, with his investors losing everything.

The case was referred to the Serious Fraud Office, who, after investigations, charged Foster in May 2007, leading to 2010's trial and conviction.

During the course of the investigation, it was found that £12m of the money raised had been channeled into an illegal pyramid investing scheme, Planline, thought to be based in the Cayman Islands, of which only £1,703 was ever recovered.

It was also discovered that Foster had used large sums from the scheme to fund an extravagant lifestyle, buying a £600,000 farmhouse near Sittingbourne, Kent, which he stocked with exotic animals and where he installed Koi carp ponds. A further £700,000 was spent on cars, and it was estimated that Foster had withdrawn £3m in cash.

== Trial and conviction ==
On 9 March 2010, Kevin Foster was convicted at Harrow Crown Court in northwest London, following a seven-week trial which began on 18 January 2010.

Foster faced eight charges under the Financial Services and Markets Act 2000 and eight offences under the Theft Act 1968. The jury found him guilty on 14 of the charges, but acquitted him of one theft charge in relation to £220,000 of cash found at his home, and failed to reach a verdict on another relating to a Ferrari Spyder he owned.

On 16 April 2010 Foster was sentenced to 10 years imprisonment. At the sentencing hearing, Judge Nick Madge described the fraud as being "a substantial and deliberate course of conduct that was sophisticated and elaborate".

At appeal, on 31 March 2011, Foster's theft convictions were ruled unsafe and overturned, and his sentence was reduced to 9 years.

== Victims ==
Foster mainly targeted low-income people in small, close-knit, communities, many of which were in the valleys of South Wales. Most investors lost relatively small sums, but some lost considerable amounts, including one investor (who chose not to be identified) who lost £180,000, which he had raised by mortgaging his house and borrowing on his credit cards.

== See also ==
- Pyramid scheme
- Affinity fraud
- List of real-life con artists
- List of people from Kent
