= List of people from the London Borough of Bromley =

Among those who were born in the London Borough of Bromley, or have dwelt within the borders of the modern borough are (alphabetical order):

- Dina Asher-Smith (born 1995), athlete, Olympian, born and went to school in Orpington
- David Bowie (1947–2016), musician, moved to Bromley with his family in 1953
- Malcolm Campbell (1885–1948), Grand Prix racing driver, born in Chislehurst
- Nicholas Cleobury (born 1950), conductor
- Stephen Cleobury (1948–2019), organist and conductor
- Richmal Crompton (1890–1969), author, the Just William stories for children; lived at The Glebe in Oakley Road, Bromley Common
- Charles Darwin (1809–1882), naturalist, known for his theory of evolution, lived in Downe, Bromley
- Eugénie de Montijo (1826–1920), the last empress of France, lived in exile with her husband Napoleon III at Camden Place in Chislehurst from 1870 until 1885
- Jack Dee (born 1961), stand-up comedian
- Nigel Farage (born 1964), politician, leader of UKIP, resides in Downe
- Florence Farr (1860–1917), actress and composer, born in Bickley
- Billy Idol (born 1955), member of 70s rock band Generation X
- Jo Johnson (born 1971), ex-MP of Orpington, brother to Boris Johnson (ex prime minister)
- Langley Kirkwood (born 1973), actor and athlete
- Nish Kumar (born 1985), comedian, grew up in Bromley and Croydon
- Hanif Kureishi (born 1954), playwright, born in Bromley
- Pixie Lott (born 1991), singer
- Bob Monkhouse (1928–2003), entertainer, born in Beckenham
- Charles Langbridge Morgan (1894–1958), playwright, born at a house in Rodway Road in Bromley
- Napoleon III (1808–1873), last emperor of France, lived and died in exile at Camden Place in Chislehurst
- William Pitt the Elder, Earl of Chatham (1708–1778), statesman, lived and died at Hayes Place, a former house in Hayes
- William Pitt the Younger (1759–1806), statesman and Prime Minister, born in his father's house in Hayes
- Dorothy Richardson (1873–1957), novelist, lived and died in Beckenham
- Pete Sears (born 1948), musician, producer, composer, environmental and human rights activist, Hayes, Bromley
- Matt Terry (born 1993), singer, winner of the thirteenth season of The X Factor
- Vikkstar (born 1995), Youtuber, resided in the Sidemen house in Farnborough between 2014 and 2019, moved to another house in Farnborough
- H. G. Wells (1866–1946), author, The War of the Worlds, born in Atlas House, 47 High Street, Bromley<ref>"HG Wells". The Literature Network.</ref * [[Joe Wilkinson]] Comedian, born in Bromley 1975 * [[William Hyde Wollaston]] (1766–1828), chemist, discovered the elements [[rhodium]] and [[palladium]]; lived and died in Chislehurst<ref>Usselman, Melvyn C. (18 December 2018). "William Hyde Wollaston". Encyclopædia Britannica.<

/ref>
