= Hallam Ashley =

British professional photographer

Hallam Ashley FRPS (9 July 1900 – 24 October 1987) was a British professional photographer who, amongst other things, photographed buildings for the National Buildings Record for nearly 40 years. A book of his photographs of East Anglia was published in 2010.

== Life and work ==
Born on 9 July 1900 in Nottinghamshire to Arthur Ernest and Hannah Elizabeth (née Hallam) Ashley, Hallam Ashley was the son and grandson to professional photographers. In a 2010 interview his daughter remarked; “It was in his blood to be a photographer”. Shortly after he was born, his father took over the family photographic and picture-framing business and moved it to Sutton-in-Ashfield in 1912; the business having been founded by Hallam's grandfather John in Retford in 1852.

Aged 18, Hallam Ashley signed up to the Royal Air Force, but he quickly learned that his father had died and had to return home to run the family business. Not wishing to be tied to studio work, Hallam sold the business in 1921 and became a freelance photographer. Over the years, he took on a variety of work from scholastic portraiture to photographing boats and bungalows for holiday catalogues and wedding photography.

Ashley met his first wife May McKelvey in Northern Ireland. They married in 1929 and settled in Norwich where he spent the rest of his life. Ashley began to establish himself as a photographer of repute in the 1930s and, in 1935, he was elected a Fellow of the Royal Photographic Society. Also that year, he was appointed to the Geological Photographs Committee of the British Association for the Advancement of Science reflecting his interest in the subject which resulted in his many photographs of coastal erosion, quarrying and details of rock and glacial formations. At the start of World War II, he again volunteered to join the RAF but his desire to fly was thwarted for the second time as his expertise was utilised in their photographic section rather than at the controls.

Prior to the war, he carried out work photographing archaeological sites, excavations and similar subjects primarily for the Castle Museum in Norwich and, in 1946, he began photographing buildings for the National Buildings Record (later the National Monuments Record) and continued this work until 1983 when ill health forced him into retirement. Ashley became interested in mills after meeting Rex Wailes in 1926, the pioneer of the UK's windmill repair movement, and took photographs that were used in the books and articles published by Wailes on English windmills. Ashley went on to become a member of the Society for the Protection of Ancient Buildings working closely with the Wind and Watermill Section.

In 1964, Hallam Ashley had a one-man exhibition of his work in Norwich Castle Museum that was reviewed favourably by the British Journal of Photography.

Ashley passed on his knowledge by teaching photography at the Norwich College of Further Education.

== Legacy ==
Collections of Hallam Ashley's photographic work are held by a number of institutions. His four decades of photographs for the National Buildings and Monuments Records alongside other photographs, donated by his daughters, are held by Historic England in their archive; The Hallam Ashley Collection, which as well as architectural photographs, also contains photographs of East Anglia, mainly, but not exclusively, of Norfolk. Prints by Hallam Ashley can be viewed on their website. In 2010, the book Traditional Crafts and Industries in East Anglia: The Photographic Legacy of Hallam Ashley was published by English Heritage who also use his photographs on postcards.

Ashley's work for Norwich Castle Museum, consisting of 1000 glass plates, acetate negatives, colour slides and prints, taken between the 1930s and the 1980s, of mainly of geological, geomorphological and landscape subject matter in East Anglia, has been scanned to create an online database by the Natural Sciences Conservation Group, a branch of the International Institute for Conservation of Historic and Artistic Works.

The Mills Archive has a collection ‘The Hallam Ashley Photograph Collection’ that can be viewed online. The mill photographs were donated to the Society for the Protection of Ancient Buildings by his daughter in 1998 and transferred to The Mills Archive in 2004. The Science Museum, London also holds mill photographs taken by Ashley.

In 1964, Hallam Ashley undertook a photographic study of the medieval wooden figures of the renowned ‘angel roof’ commissioned by St. Mary's Church in Bury St. Edmunds, Suffolk to mark the marriage of Henry VI and Margaret of Anjou. He took over 500 shots and, as well as being in the Historic England archive, some of these images are held in the Conway Library, whose archive of primarily architectural photographs is in the process of being digitised as part of the wider Courtauld Connects project.

== Personal life ==
Ashley's first wife May died in childbirth shortly before the end of the war leaving 2 daughters, Kathleen (Kay) and Patricia, who both now live in Northern Ireland. In 1952, he married fellow photographer, Dorothy Baines.

Hallam Ashley died in Norwich on 24 October 1987.

== Selected publications either by or including photographs by Hallam Ashley ==
- Beauty of Norfolk, Hallam Ashley, Norwich : Jarrold & Sons Ltd, 1952 (part of the Magna-Crome series)
- ‘The Camera in Ireland’ by Hallam Ashley in The British Journal Photographic Almanac and Photographer's Daily Companion, 1947
- Medieval England: A Social History and Archaeology from the Conquest to 1600 AD, Colin Platt, Routledge, 2003
- Martello Towers, Sheila Sutcliffe, Fairleigh Dickinson University Press, 1973
- Gothic England, Sacheverell Sitwell, Weidenfeld & Nicolson, 1969
- The Buildings of England: Northeast Norfolk and Norwich, Nikolaus Pevsner, Penguin Books, 1962
- The Buildings of England: Northwest and South Norfolk, Nikolaus Pevsner, Penguin Books, 1962
- The Cathedrals of England, Volume 10, Harry Batsford, Charles Fry, Bryan Little, Batsford, 1960.
