= Nigel Egg =

British blues rock singer-songwriter

Nigel Egg (born Nigel Eccleston, 1949, Ramsgate, Kent, England) is a British blues rock singer-songwriter, who writes non-traditional blues chronicling middle-class American topics and concerns, that are more usually encountered in country related genres. He migrated to the Midwestern United States in 1972. After a 25-year hiatus from music where he focused on raising his family, Egg returned to writing and performing music in 2005, producing songs that reflected the dual nature of his two prior musical identities. This new material received numerous awards, and as his fan base grew.

== Biography ==
Egg answered an advertisement in Melody Maker in 1968, and was the winner of an audition to join the 'radical rock' group Nexus, led by Kurt Biere of Polydor Records, with Ray Chappell (ex-Savoy Brown) on bass. They were produced by Georgio Gomelski, but disbanded in 1969 before any product was released. Egg jammed with Supertramp, Mott the Hoople, and other musicians who frequented The Cabin in Shepherd's Bush, London. He came to the US in 1972 as a graduate student at the University of Minnesota. In 1975 he became the blues harmonica instructor at the West Bank School of Music, where he taught until 1985. He also taught many group classes in harmonica and guitar through community education programs, and community organizations such as COMPAS.

In 1975, he joined the group Big Sky, which became The Jackelopes. In 1978, he was hired on a CETA grant as a community artist through COMPAS, and worked as a community music maker based in the Dayton's Bluff area of St. Paul. He was a full-time musician in numerous bands until 1985, when he began a 25-year corporate career at Lutheran Brotherhood.

In 2007, he returned to the music industry and, in June 2010, Egg released the album, Big Bang Baby Boom (Spiff Key).

Egg is an active member of the Minnesota Association of Songwriters (MAS), and currently serves on the MAS board of directors as Showcase Organizer. He is a member of the Minnesota Blues Society (MNBS), and also volunteers through MNBS as a Blues for Kids instructor.

== Awards ==
He won first place at the 2004 Minnesota Folk Festival New Folk song contest in 2004, and was the runner-up in 2003. He placed second at the Telluride Blues and Brews festival's Acoustic Blues competition in 2007, and came third at the 2008 Highway 61 Folks Festival in Mahtowa, Minnesota. He is a seven-time winner of the "mnspin" music competition sponsored by mnartists.org in 2007 and 2008.
