= Mick Shields (newspaper manager) =

Ronald McGregor Pollock Shields (30 July 1921 – 25 December 1987), known as Mick Shields, was a British newspaper manager.

Born on 30 July 1921, Shields attended Swanage Grammar School and the University of London before serving in the Royal Artillery; he was a gunnery officer during the Second World War and was later put in charge of police in the Italian city of Trieste.

Shields ended his military service as a major. After demobilisation in 1948, he joined Associated Newspapers, the parent company of the Daily Mail and the Daily Sketch. He became interested in market research, setting up National Opinion Polls, and computing. He was promoted to group advertisement director in 1963. In 1970, he was appointed managing director of Associated. The following year, the Mail and the Sketch were merged in an effort to stave off losses from both papers; Shields was a leading negotiator with the trade unions, which avoided strikes as Associated made staffing cuts to the newly merged, now-tabloid Daily Mail.

Shields also led Associated's efforts to diversify its assets, by buying into the oil and travel industries. He was appointed managing director of the Associated Newspapers Holdings Plc in 1986 and deputy chairman in 1987. He died on 25 December 1987. His obituary in The Times noted that he was "one of the leading figures of Fleet Street".
