= George Chatterton (British Army officer) =

George James Stewart Chatterton
- Born: 2 December 1911
- Died: 12 November 1987 (aged 75)
- Military career
- Allegiance: United Kingdom
- Branch: Royal Air Force; British Army
- Service years: 1930–1935 (Air Force); 1938–1945 (Army)
- Rank: Brigadier
- Commands: Glider Pilot Regiment
- Conflicts: World War II
- Awards: Distinguished Service Order

Brigadier George James Stewart Chatterton DSO, OBE (2 December 1911 – 12 November 1987) was a soldier in the British Army who commanded the Glider Pilot Regiment during World War II.

== Early life and education ==
Chatterton was educated at Pangbourne College from 1925 to 1929; he was Chief of the College (equivalent to Head Boy).

== Career ==
Chatterton reached the rank of Brigadier, and was known for being operational commander of the Glider Pilot Regiment during the Second World War. He was awarded the DSO in 1943. After the war, he became a stockjobber, and later devoted his time to serving as Chairman of, and fundraising over £1 million for, the Lady Hoare Thalidomide Trust. He was awarded OBE in the 1980 Birthday Honours.

In 1959 he narrated a short film by the London County Council about the education of deaf children, called 'Silent Hope'. His memoir, The Wings of Pegasus, was published in 1962.

In 1979, he appeared, alongside his wife, in a documentary called ‘The Buddha Comes to Sussex’, in which a group of Theravada Buddhist monks are setting up a new monastery in his local area.

Chatterton lived at Midhurst, in West Sussex; he died 12 November 1987.

== Bibliography ==
- Dank, Milton (1977). The Glider Gang: An Eyewitness History of World War II Glider Combat. Cassel. ISBN 0-304-30014-4.
- Lloyd, Alan (1982). The Gliders: The story of Britain's fighting gliders and the men who flew them. Corgi. ISBN 0-552-12167-3.
- Lynch, Tim (2008). Silent Skies: Gliders At War 1939–1945. Barnsley: Pen & Sword Military. ISBN 978-0-7503-0633-1.
- Chatterton, George (1982). The Wings of Pegasus. MacDonald & Co (UK); Battery Press Inc. (US). ISBN 0-89839-060-5.
- Otway, Lieutenant-Colonel T.B.H. (1990). The Second World War 1939–1945 Army – Airborne Forces. London: Imperial War Museum. ISBN 0-901627-57-7.
