= Alexandra Adams =

- Born: 1994/1995; Newport, South Wales
- Education: Northeastern University London (MA); Cardiff University School of Medicine (PhD)
- Known for: UK's first deafblind doctor
- Medical career
- Profession: Physician
- Field: Palliative care
- Website: Official Website

Alexandra Elaine Adams (1994/95 – ) is the first Deafblind doctor in the United Kingdom.

== Biography ==
Adams grew up in Kent, England. She was born deafblind and with Ehlers-Danlos Syndrome and Mast cell activation syndrome.

Adams was a Paralympic Games-hopeful as a swimmer. After being hospitalized for 18-months as a 16-year old, Adams could no longer compete as a professional athlete and switched to medicine.

In 2023, Adams was a keynote speaker at the Deafblind UK Conference.

Adams studied medicine for a decade at Cardiff University Medical School and qualified as a doctor in 2026, making her the first deafblind doctor in the UK. She had a 17-month break in her studies during the COVID-19 pandemic as well as bouts of sepsis. She also graduated from Northeastern University – London with a MA in Creative Writing.

She told This Morning in 2026 that “My disabilities haven’t been the obstacle in my medical degree. It’s been the perceptions of other people... I think discrimination has been a big hurdle.”

During medical school, Adams began social media account to describe her experiences studying to become a doctor, explain the assistive technology she uses, and break down myths. As a doctor, she focuses on palliative care.
