= Keiron Jenkins =

Welsh rugby union footballer

- Born: Keiron Jenkins; 17 February 1987 (age 39) Rhondda, Wales
- Height: 1.88 m (6 ft 2 in)
- Weight: 122 kg (19 st 3 lb)

Rugby union career
- Current team: Pontypridd RFC
Senior career
Years	Team	Apps	(Points)
2011-	Newport GD	6	(0)
- Correct as of 14:01, 10 January 2012 (UTC)

Keiron Jenkins (born 17 February 1987) is a Welsh rugby union player.

Jenkins previously played for Bedwas RFC and he made his senior debut for Newport Gwent Dragons against Ulster on 3 September 2011.

Jenkins moved to Pontypridd RFC at the commencement of the 2012–2013 season.
