= Ronald James Marsh =

English author (1914–1987)

- Born: 7 August 1914; Broadstairs, Kent, England
- Died: 11 January 1987 (aged 72); Chatham, Kent, England
- Occupations: Writer, librarian
- Spouse(s): Maud Ethel Chandler (m. 1936) Phyllis Glenice Higgins (m. 1947)

Ronald James Marsh (7 August 1914 – 11 January 1987), was an English writer.

== Life ==
Marsh was born in Broadstairs in Kent and spent much of his life in Rochester, where he was City Librarian. The son of Donald Alfred Sackett Marsh and Helen Cicely Perkins, he was born on 7 August 1914 and died aged 72 in Chatham, Kent, on 11 January 1987. He married first in Thanet in 1936, Maud Ethel Chandler and second in Oxford in 1947, Phyllis Glenice Higgins.

His most widely known novel, Irene (1949), was made into a 1950 film Once a Sinner starring:

- Patricia Kirkwood as Irene James
- Jack Watling as John Ross
- Joy Shelton as Vera Lamb
- Sydney Tafler as Jimmy Smart
- Thora Hird as Mrs. James

The story is that of John Ross, a bank clerk, who is in love with Irene James for whom he will do anything, including stooping to crime. Irene cannot give up her criminal former boyfriend, Jimmy Smart, while John realises, too late, that he should have remained with his former fiancée. The story ultimately ends in the tragedy so often associated with obsessive love.

Marsh's other novels include:

- Your Brother Still (1953), which concerns arson in a dockyard (an offence still punishable by death at that time).
- The Quarry (1962), which was reviewed as being similar in style to Thomas Hardy in its depiction of a man's endurance in the face of the onset of despair.
