= Tom Perchard =

British music journalist (born 1976)

Tom Perchard (born 1976, Canterbury, England) is a writer and musicologist.

== Career ==
He is the author of Lee Morgan: His Life, Music, and Culture (Equinox, 2006), the first biography of the jazz trumpeter Lee Morgan (1938–72). His other works include After Django: Making Jazz in Postwar France (University of Michigan Press, 2015). His work is concerned with the historical and cultural situation of music-making and listening, focussing specifically on American jazz in the mid-20th century.

Since 2009, Perchard has been a lecturer in the Department of Music at Goldsmiths College. He has also taught at University of Westminster. He is a contributor to The Wire.
