= Kaul =

Kashmiri surname

Kaul (also spelled Koul; Kashmiri: 𑆑𑆿𑆬 (Sharada), कौल (Devanagari), كۄال (Nasta'liq), romanized: Kọ̄l, lit. 'well born') is a Kashmiri surname that is used by the Kashmiri Pandit community in India.

The word Koul, meaning well born, is derived from Kula, the Sanskrit term for family or clan.

== Origins ==
There are several theories regarding the origins of Kaul as a surname.

=== Koul from Mahakoul ===
One says that it is associated with the word Mahakaul (Sanskrit: महाकौल, romanized: Mahākaula), an epithet for Shiva. Shiva followers were thus called Kaula. Koul therefore means a devotee of Shiva.

=== Koul/Kaul from Shakta worship ===
Another states that since the Saraswat Brahmins of Kashmira were believers in Shaivism and Shakta, the peak of Shaivism in Kashmir around the 9th–12th century gave rise to use of the name. This has led many scholars to believe that almost all Kashmiri Pandits were Kauls/Kouls and they were later subdivided into different nicknames, then with the passage of time these nicknames became surnames. In recent years the use of the nicknames is being progressively discarded and the surname Kaul/Koul is being adopted by almost all such people. The word Kaul/Koul is associated with being an Aghoreshwar (Sanskrit: अघोरेश्वर, romanized: aghōrēśvara, lit. 'enlightened'). The Sādhakas (Sanskrit: साधक, romanized: sādhaka, lit. 'practitioners') of the Tantra, associated with Shakti worship, are believed to reach the top of the spiritual ladder, and thus become a Kaul/Koul.

== Notable people with Kaul surname ==
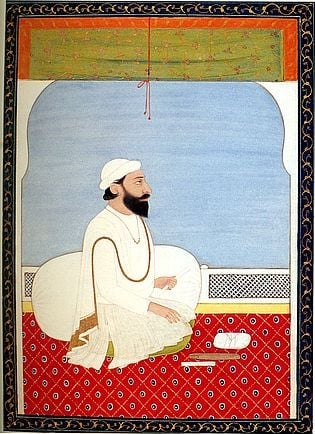
Portrait of Radha Krishan Kaul, an astrologer of the Sikh Empire. Pahari-Sikh; attributed to Chhaju Ram, from the family of Nainsukh of Guler, ca.1840

- Anita Kaul (1954–2016), Indian Administrative Service officer
- Bansi Kaul (born 1949), Indian writer and theatre director
- Bharat Kaul, Bengali actor
- Brij Mohan Kaul (1912–1972), commanded the Indian forces in the Sino-Indian War
- Ekta Kaul (born 1987), Indian television actress
- Hari Kishan Kaul (1869–1942), Kashmiri politician and author
- Josh Kaul (born 1980), 45th Attorney General of Wisconsin
- Kailas Nath Kaul (1905–1983), Indian botanist and agricultural scientist, brother of Kamala
- Kamala Kaul Nehru (1899–1936), Indian freedom fighter and wife of first Indian Prime Minister Jawaharlal Nehru
- Kanchi Kaul (born 1982), Indian TV actress and model
- Krishna Kaul (born 1989), Indian rapper, known as KR$NA, and formerly as Prozpekt
- Mahendra Kaul (1922–2018), British BBC broadcaster and television presenter
- Manav Kaul (born 1976), Indian theatre director, playwright, actor and film-maker
- Mani Kaul (1944–2011), Indian film director
- Manohar Kaul (1925–1999), Indian painter
- Matthias Kaul (1949–2020), German musician
- Niklas Kaul (born 1998), German athlete specializing in the decathlon
- Pratap Kishen Kaul (1929–2007), ambassador of India to the United States (1986–1989)
- Rajni Kaul, British BBC Hindi broadcaster and radio presenter, wife of Mahendra
- Raj Kaul, Indian Sanskrit and Persian scholar and Nehru family patriarch
- Sheila Kaul (1915–2015), Indian politician, cabinet minister
- Siddarth Kaul (born 1990), Indian cricketer, medium pace bowler
- Swaroop Krishna Kaul (born 1934), Air Chief Marshal of the Indian Air Force, Chief of the Air Staff (India) (1993–1995)
- Sanjay Kaul (born 1962), Indian businessman and founder of the University of Petroleum and Energy Studies
- Sanjay Kishan Kaul (born 1958), Judge, Supreme Court of India and former lawyer
- Triloki Nath Kaul (1913–2000), Indian diplomat, Indian Foreign Secretary (1967–1972)
- Vijayendra Nath Kaul (born 1943), Indian civil servant, Comptroller and Auditor General (2002–2008)

== Notable people with Koul surname ==
- Anil Koul (born 1972), Indian pharmacologist
- Omkar Nath Koul (1941–2018), Indian linguist
- Scaachi Koul (born 1991), Canadian journalist and writer
- Shadi Lal Koul (1954–2020), Kashmiri actor

== See also ==
- Kaula
