= 1987 in British television =

This is a list of British television related events from 1987.

== Events ==
=== January ===
- 1 January – New Year's Day highlights on BBC1 include the network television premiere of Local Hero and the film To Have and Have Not.
- 2 January
  - The Japanese-American animated series ThunderCats makes its UK debut on BBC1.
  - The network television premiere of the 1982 Steven Spielberg-produced supernatural horror film Poltergeist on BBC1, starring JoBeth Williams and Craig T. Nelson.
- 3 January
  - Closedowns reappear on Yorkshire Television when its experiment with 24-hour television, which had begun last August and had consisted of a simulcast of music video channel Music Box, is put on hiatus.
  - The US sitcom Perfect Strangers makes its British debut on BBC1.
- 5 January – EastEnders is sold to Australia and goes to air on ABC along with In Sickness and In Health.
- 6 January
  - The Guardian reports that Central has acquired the European division of the American production company Filmfair for £1.5million. Filmfair goes on to produce several of the station's networked children's series before being sold on to the Storm Group (Caspian) in 1991.
  - Inspector Morse, based on the books by Colin Dexter, makes its debut on ITV with John Thaw in the title role; the series will run until 2000 and generate spin-offs.
- 7 January – Ben Elton's comedy series Filthy Rich & Catflap premieres on BBC2.
- 9 January – The Friday night chat show The Last Resort with Jonathan Ross makes its debut on Channel 4.
- 12 January – The five-part Australian World War I drama Anzacs makes its UK debut on BBC1, starring Paul Hogan.
- 13 January – Yorkshire Television becomes the second ITV region to launch a Jobfinder service. It broadcasts for an hour after closedown.
- 16 January
  - The Zircon affair becomes public knowledge when The Guardian reports that the government ordered the BBC to shelve a documentary in the Secret Society series about the Zircon satellite. Two days later, documentary maker Duncan Campbell is subject to an injunction preventing him from discussing or writing about the programme's content, but he subsequently writes an article about the episode for the New Statesman magazine.
  - During a live trailer shown on ITV for the Channel 4 music show The Tube, presenter Jools Holland uses the phrase "be there or be ungroovy fuckers". The programme is taken off air for three weeks as a result.
- 29 January
  - Alasdair Milne is forced to resign as Director-General of the BBC by the newly appointed Chairman of the Board of Governors, Marmaduke Hussey. His deputy, senior BBC accountant Michael Checkland, becomes acting D-G.
  - A strike by set designers means that Crimewatch UK is, this month, broadcast from the Grandstand studio.

=== February ===
- 5 February – The 200th edition of the sports quiz A Question of Sport is broadcast on BBC1. At this occasion, Princess Anne appears on the programme, a matter of weeks after team captain Emlyn Hughes mistook a picture of her on a horse for jockey John Reid. The episode gains a record audience of nineteen million viewers.
- 10 February – ITV begins showing the American legal drama series L.A. Law, starring Harry Hamlin.
- 15 February – Disney's Adventures of the Gummi Bears makes its UK television premiere on ITV.
- 21 February – An apparently inebriated Oliver Reed appears on the ITV chat show Aspel & Company where he stumbles and lurches around the set.
- 24 February – The sitcom Hardwicke House, set in a dysfunctional comprehensive school, makes its debut on ITV. However, the series is badly received by critics and viewers and is abruptly cancelled after just two episodes are shown, the second being broadcast the following evening. The remaining five episodes, although recorded and scheduled are never transmitted.
- 26 February – Michael Checkland is formally appointed as Director-General of the BBC.
- 27 February – The BBC and ITV begins a week of programming aimed at educating people about the AIDS virus. Highlights include AIDS – The Facts on BBC1, a short programme of facts and figures covering frequently asked questions about the disease and First AIDS, an ITV comedy-sketch show produced by London Weekend Television and featuring Mike Smith, Jonathan Ross and Emma Freud.

=== March ===
- 3 March – BBC1 begins showing the Rock and roll themed drama series Tutti Frutti, starring Robbie Coltrane and Emma Thompson.
- 5 March – Channel 4 shows Neil Jordan's 1984 fantasy horror film The Company of Wolves.
- 6 March – BBC1 airs The Elephant Man, David Lynch's acclaimed 1980 film about Joseph Merrick, starring Anthony Hopkins and John Hurt.
- 9 March
  - Debut of Central's Intimate Contact, a drama dealing with the issue of AIDS.
  - Debut of the comedy sketch series French and Saunders on BBC2, written by and starring Dawn French and Jennifer Saunders.
- 21 March – Opportunity Knocks returns after a decade-long break on BBC1. It is presented by Bob Monkhouse and airs under the title Bob Says Opportunity Knocks.

=== April ===
- 3 April – Debut of the panel game show Through the Keyhole on ITV, presented by David Frost with Loyd Grossman.
- 6 April – Thomas the Tank Engine and Friends makes its debut in Australia on ABC within the Barley the Clown strand.
- 9 April
  - The children's animated series The Adventures of Spot, based on the books by Eric Hill and narrated by Just Good Friends actor and singer Paul Nicholas, makes its debut on BBC1.
  - The children's animated series The Raggy Dolls makes its debut in Australia on ABC.
- 11 April – Jan Leeming presents her final bulletin for BBC News.
- 18 April – The final edition of the Saturday morning children's show Saturday Superstore is broadcast on BBC1.
- 20 April – The network television premiere of the 1983 thriller WarGames on BBC1, starring Matthew Broderick, Ally Sheedy and Dabney Coleman.
- 23 April
  - Channel 4 starts broadcasting into the early hours on Thursdays, Fridays and Saturdays when it launches Nightime. One of the programmes is the discussion show After Dark which is broadcast live and with no scheduled end time.
  - Yorkshire extends broadcasting into the early hours on Thursday, Friday and Saturday nights by introducing a Through Till Three strand.
- 24 April – The final episode of the music series The Tube is broadcast on Channel 4.
- 25 April
  - The Australian soap opera Prisoner: Cell Block H makes its debut on Central. This is believed by many viewers to be the series debut on British television, but in fact it has been running in the Yorkshire region since 1984. Central is the first region to conclude the series, in December 1991.
  - Central becomes the first station to keep its transmitters on air all night when it launches More Central. Programmes are shown into the early hours with the rest of the night filled by its Jobfinder service which airs from closedown until the start of TV-am.
  - The US sitcom ALF makes its UK debut on ITV.
- 28 April – BBC television programming in Hindi and Urdu finishes after more than 20 years following the transmission of the final editions of Asian Magazine and Gharbar. A new programme for the Asian community will be launched later in the year but will be broadcast in English.
- 28 April – ITV shows the network premiere of the 1984 comedy film Police Academy, starring Steve Guttenberg and Kim Cattrall.

=== May ===
- 1 May – Launch of the late-night discussion programme After Dark on Channel 4 which is broadcast live and is notable for having no scheduled end time.
- 3 May – The youth show Network 7 makes its debut on Channel 4. It is shown live at Sunday lunchtime.
- 9 May – Ireland's Johnny Logan wins the Eurovision Song Contest 1987, held in Brussels and broadcast on BBC1, with "Hold Me Now".
- 10 May – ITV airs Escape from Sobibor, a made-for-television film telling the story of the mass escape from the Sobibór extermination camp during World War II, the most successful uprising by Jewish prisoners of German extermination camps.
- 14 May – Two television reporters, Michael Buerk from the BBC and Peter Sharp from ITN, are expelled from South Africa as a result of their coverage of university demonstrations.
- 22 May – 20 June – The BBC airs coverage of the first Rugby World Cup from Australia and New Zealand. This is the only time that they have shown the tournament.
- 31 May – The final episode of the children's fantasy series Super Gran airs on ITV.

=== June ===
- 1 June – Live presentation of Children's ITV is launched and are presented by former Central announcers Gary Terzza and Debbie Shore.
- 8 June – BBC2 shows the Moonlighting episode "I Am Curious... Maddie" in which, after two years of romantic tension, Bruce Willis and Cybil Shepard finally make love following a huge argument.
- 9 June – Debut of the Tyne Tees-produced chart show The Roxy, presented by David Jensen and Kevin Sharkey. The show is intended as a stablemate for the Independent radio hit parade The Network Chart Show following a similar format to the BBC's Top of the Pops, but its Newcastle upon Tyne location impinges on its ability to secure live performances. It also suffers from poor ratings because it does not have a regular slot on the ITV network and is cancelled in April 1988.
- 11–12 June – Coverage of the results of the 1987 General Election is shown on BBC1 and ITV.
- 19 June – Screening of The Grand Knockout Tournament, an It's a Knockout special featuring members of the British Royal Family alongside sporting and other celebrities. Also known as It's a Royal Knockout, the event attracts much media derision and is deemed to have been a failure, although it raises £1 million for charity.
- 22 June – The BBC's lunchtime children's block moves from BBC1 to BBC2. It is shown slightly earlier, at 1:20pm.
- 27 June – Family Fortunes returns to ITV after a 2-year break, with new presenter Les Dennis who goes on to become the show's longest-serving host until 2002. The new series also sees the debut of the short-lived coloured game board.
- 29 June – Schools programmes are broadcast on ITV for the last time. The service will be transferred to Channel 4 from September to allow ITV to launch a regular daytime schedule.

=== July ===
- 5 July – Watching, Jim Hitchmough's comedy about a mismatched couple and starring Paul Bown and Emma Wray, makes its debut on ITV.
- 7 July – Jeremy Isaacs, Chief Executive of Channel 4, announces that advertising revenue for the channel for 1986–87 has exceeded costs for the first time since its launch, providing a £20m profit.
- 16 July – Channel 4 shows the first day-long coverage of women's cricket in the UK when England play Australia at Lord's. Coverage begins at 10.45 am and finishes at 6.30 pm, with breaks for the lunch and tea intervals. However, only the late-night highlights are shown in Wales, where S4C show Glamorgan against Pakistan instead.
- 17 July – ITN's News at One airs for the last time, it also marks Leonard Parkin's retirement from newsreading.
- 18 July – After a hiatus of a year, BBC1 starts showing the US crime series Miami Vice again, with the second season's feature-length episode The Prodigal Son.
- 20 July
  - ITV's lunchtime news programme moves to a 12:30pm slot. Consequently, News at One ends after eleven years on the air.
  - Also pre school children's programmes and other programmes previously shown between 12 and 1:00pm move an hour earlier to 11 to 12:00am as the new series of long running game show Winner Takes All airs at the old slot time of 12:00pm now hosted by Geoffrey Wheeler replacing Jimmy Tarbuck.
- 22 July – ITV's investigational show The Cook Report airs its first edition.
- 25 July – A new weekly programme for the Asian community, Network East, makes its debut on BBC2. Broadcast in English, the show replaces Asian Magazine and Gharbar which had ended three months earlier.
- July – TV-am reintroduces a weekday news programme, GMB Newshour, airing initially from the start of programmes until 7am. Good Morning Britain now airs between 7am and 9am.

=== August ===
- 2 August – Debut of the crime drama The Ruth Rendell Mysteries on ITV.
- 17 August – Thames begins 24-hour broadcasting and becomes the first ITV region to begin transmitting all through the night on a permanent basis.
- 20 August – In the wake of the previous day's Hungerford massacre in which 16 people were shot dead by gun enthusiast Michael Ryan, the BBC, ITV and Channel 4 pull several forthcoming films and programmes containing violence from their schedules. Among them are the 1966 western Nevada Smith, an episode of The Professionals and the 1982 post-apocalyptic film Battletruck. A showing of First Blood is also cancelled. The BBC also takes Miami Vice off the air, initially for three weeks, then completely for ten months, due to the on-going debate about screen violence.
- 25 August – BBC1 finally airs Dennis Potter's television play Brimstone and Treacle which was originally scheduled to air in 1976 but was withdrawn shortly before broadcast.
- 28 August – LWT and Anglia begin 24-hour transmissions. The first edition of the LWT produced Night Network is broadcast that night in both regions, along with TVS, and is described as a late night version of a Saturday morning children's show. The programme is an immediate success and is expanded to most other ITV regions the following year.
- 31 August – The final episode of the sitcom Terry & June is broadcast on BBC1.

=== September ===
- 1 September – Channel 4 premieres the Martin Scorsese-directed music video of Michael Jackson's "Bad".
- 5 September – BBC1 shows the network premiere of the 1983 Tom Cruise-starring teen comedy film Risky Business.
- 7 September
  - TV-am recommences broadcasts each day from 6am. This is the first time since its launch in 1983 that they have transmitted throughout their allocated broadcast hours.
  - ITV launches a full morning schedule with advertising for the first time.
    - The new service includes regular five-minute national and regional news bulletins.
    - The new game show Chain Letters makes its debut today as part of the service, presented by Jeremy Beadle shown at 9:25am.
    - At 10:00am, The American daytime soap opera Santa Barbara becomes the first one of that genre to be broadcast on TV in the UK. The series originally shown as one hour episodes were split into two half hour episodes. In addiction, today's episode was also repeated at 3:00pm.
    - Debut of the morning discussion show The Time, The Place being shown at 10:30am.
  - The Disney animated series DuckTales makes its UK debut on Children's ITV before being aired in the US in syndication several days later.
  - Debut of the children's adventure game show Knightmare on Children's ITV.
  - Sylvester McCoy becomes the seventh actor to play The Doctor in the long-running science-fiction series Doctor Who, making his first full appearance in the role in the serial Time and the Rani. He also makes his sole cameo debut as the Sixth Doctor following Colin Baker's refusal to reprise the role for the serial, in part due to his abrupt removal from the show.
- 8 September – Anglia announces that its Anglia knight ident will be replaced by a computer-generated logo from early 1988. However, the knight will continue to have a presence in the Anglia headquarters reception.
- 10 September – ITV screens Robert Zemeckis's 1984 action comedy film Romancing the Stone, starring Michael Douglas, Kathleen Turner and Danny Devito.
- 12 September – The third series of game show Telly Addicts moves to a Saturday for this year only on the slot which formerly had The Late, Late Breakfast Show. Therefore host Noel Edmonds remained on BBC1's Saturday night schedule after the aforementioned show got cancelled the previous year.
- 13 September – ITV debuts the comedy series The New Statesman, starring Rick Mayall as the slimy and lecherous MP Alan B'Stard.
- 14 September – After 30 years on ITV, ITV Schools moves to Channel 4. Consequently, Channel 4's weekday programming begins at 9:30am, or noon when schools programmes are not being shown.
- 17 September –
  - CNN International launches its UK operation from an office located at 25/28 Old Burlington Street, London.
  - Rowan Atkinson stars in the third series of the BBC comedy Blackadder the Third, now set during the Georgian Era, also featuring Tony Robinson and Hugh Laurie.
- 21 September – As part of Channel 4's expansion of programme hours, a new weekday lunchtime schedule is introduced. The first edition of a weekday business and financial news programme Business Daily is broadcast and this is followed by a new children's slot called Just4Fun. At 1pm, a one-hour block of programmes from the newly formed Open College begins.
- 25 September – A US version of Top of the Pops makes its debut on CBS in the US with Nia Peeples as its presenter. The launch of a US version of TOTP allows American acts to make live appearances on the show more easily without the need to travel to London while also giving British acts a chance to appear on US television as each edition includes footage from the UK series and details of the current UK Top Ten.
- 26 September
  - Debut of the Saturday morning children's show Going Live! on BBC1, presented by Phillip Schofield and Sarah Greene.
  - Debut of the long-running children's series ChuckleVision on BBC1.
- 28 September – Charlene Mitchell, played by Kylie Minogue, makes her first British appearance on BBC1's Neighbours.
- 30 September – BBC2 airs Malcolm McKay's ScreenPlay The Interrogation of John, a film concerning the police questioning of a potential murder suspect, starring Denis Quilley, Bill Paterson and Michael Fitzgerald; it later forms the first of a three-part series titled A Wanted Man which further develops the story and airs in 1989.

=== October ===
- 5 October – Following his expulsion from South Africa in May, Michael Buerk presents the BBC One O'clock News for the first time.
- 9 October–8 November – The BBC covers the 1987 Cricket World Cup. However, due to the time difference – the tournament is held in India and Pakistan – live coverage is restricted to the final overs of England's matches, although England's semi-final and the final are broadcast live, and in full.
- 11 October – The children's strand Now on Two is launched on Sunday mornings on BBC2. It airs during the Open University off-season. Consequently, Sunday Ceefax transmissions all-but end although on Saturdays, Ceefax continues to air throughout the morning, generally until around midday.
- 12 October – The debut of Going for Gold on BBC1, a general knowledge quiz presented by Henry Kelly in which contestants from fourteen different European countries compete to become the series champion. The winner of the first series, Daphne Hudson, later Fowler, receives ringside tickets at the 1988 Summer Olympics in Seoul and goes on to appear in a number of other shows including Fifteen to One which would debut the following year and Eggheads which started airing in 2003.
- 15 October – During a weather forecast, BBC meteorologist Michael Fish reports "Earlier on today, apparently, a woman rang the BBC and said she heard there was a hurricane on the way. Well, if you're watching, don't worry, there isn't, but having said that, actually, the weather will become very windy, but most of the strong winds, incidentally, will be down over Spain and across into France.". Hours later, Britain is hit by the worst storm for 284 years. Fish later draws media criticism for the comments, but later claims that they referred to Florida, USA and were linked to a news story immediately preceding the weather bulletin, but had been so widely repeated out of context that the British public remains convinced that he was referring to the approaching storm.
- 16 October – As a result of the Great Storm of 1987, electrical power to TV-am's studios is lost and an emergency programme has to be transmitted from facilities at Thames's Euston Road centre using reports from TV-am's own crews and those of ITN, TSW and TVS. The BBC's Breakfast Time, which would usually come from Lime Grove, is unable to broadcast as the studios are without power, as is most of BBC Television Centre at Wood Lane. The early part of the programme is broadcast from the continuity suite at Television Centre, usually used for Children's BBC presentation, as this area has generator support, before a larger studio is able to be brought into use.
- 17 October – The network television premiere of the 1983 horror film The Dead Zone on BBC1, which is the first of three films based on Stephen King's works to receive their UK debuts over three consecutive Saturdays.
- 18–19 October – Channel 4 airs the 1985 Holocaust film Shoah over two nights. It is shown from 8:15pm to 12:45am on 18 October and 8:30pm to 1:20am on 19 October and without ad breaks.
- 19 October – While Telly Addicts in on the Saturday night slot, Noel Edmonds hosts a new game show on the former's traditional slot on BBC1, Whatever Next... which would only last one series. The series would run until 22nd February 1988.
- 24 October – The network television premiere of the 1983 Stephen King horror film, Cujo on BBC1.
- 29 October – The Spanish animated series Around the World with Willy Fog makes its British debut on BBC1. The 26-part series concludes on 28 April 1988.
- 30 October – Debut of Channel 4's flagship current affairs documentary series Dispatches.
- 31 October – BBC1 shows a Halloween special of The Paul Daniels Magic Show as well as the network television premiere of the 1985 anthology horror film Stephen King's Cat's Eye.

=== November ===
- 2 November – Channel 4's fifth anniversary includes a showing of Tony Harrison's controversial televisual poem V which attracts complaints (mostly prior to broadcast) due to its frequent use of extreme language.
- 4–18 November – Damon and Debbie from Brookside becomes the first 'soap bubble' where they have their own miniseries which takes them into new locations and tells their own story.
- 5 November – Irish-born presenter Eamonn Andrews, best known for hosting shows such as World of Sport, What's My Line? and This Is Your Life, dies in London following heart failure at the age of 64.
- 11 November – BBC1 airs Paul Hamann's documentary Fourteen Days in May, a film that recounts the final days before the execution of Edward Earl Johnson, an American prisoner convicted of rape and murder and imprisoned in the Mississippi State Penitentiary.
- 17 November
  - Fireman Sam, a stop-motion animated children's series about a Welsh fireman voiced and narrated by actor John Alderton makes its debut on BBC1.
  - The first episode of EastEnders to feature a gay kiss airs on BBC1. The scenes see Colin Russell, played by Michael Cashman kiss partner Barry Clark (Gary Hales) on the forehead. The episode attracts a record number of complaints from angry viewers. In addition, some sections of the British media reacts with fury, dubbing the show EastBenders. Questions are also asked in parliament about whether it is appropriate to have gay men in a family show when AIDS is sweeping the country.
- 22 November – The original run of the game show Play Your Cards Right comes to an end on that day on ITV, although the series would return in March 1994 on the same channel with Bruce Forsyth presenting again.
- 23 November – The TV-am strike begins after members of the technicians union, the ACTT walk out in a dispute over the station's 'Caring Christmas Campaign'. What is meant to be a 24-hour stoppage continues for several months when staff are locked out by Managing Director Bruce Gyngell. TV-am is unable to broadcast Good Morning Britain, instead, the regular format is replaced with repeats of old shows such as Flipper, Happy Days and in particular Batman, which goes on to see a renewed appreciation of the 1960's series. By December, a skeleton service that sees non-technical staff operating cameras and Gyngell himself directing proceedings, begin to allow Good Morning Britain to start broadcasting again. The strikers are eventually sacked and replaced with non-union staff. Viewing figures remain high throughout the disruption which continues well into 1988, although normal programming gradually resumes. Other ITV stations later follow Gyngell's example.
- 25 November – BBC1 airs the first part of Desmond Wilcox's two-part documentary The Visit – Coma, a film about 11-year-old Connie who is left in a coma after being hit by a taxi while on her way home from Christmas shopping in Glasgow. The film follows Connie's journey as she begins the slow process of recovery. The second part airs on 2 December.
- 28 November – Ventriloquist Jimmy Tamley wins New Faces of '87, coming just ahead of comedian Joe Pasquale who is second.
- November
  - Michael Grade, from the BBC, is appointed Chief Executive of Channel 4 and will succeed Jeremy Isaacs on 1 January 1988.
  - A new corporate logo for the BBC, the first in sixteen years and designed by the Michael Peters Group, starts appearing in Christmas-themed product promotions. It would gradually be adopted over a period of two years, and closing credits would not regularly use the new logo until the beginning of 1990.

=== December ===
- 7 December –
  - TV-am is able to switch from airing 100% pre-recorded material with the introduction of a 30-minute live segment presented each morning by Anne Diamond.
  - Tyne Tees begins 24-hour broadcasting by launching a Jobfinder service which broadcasts throughout the night from its usual close-down time until the start of TV-am at 6am.
- 13 December – The Singing Detective is sold to Australia where it is shown on ABC.
- 14 December – TV-am extends its live broadcasting to an hour a day.
- 16 December – Yorkshire Television announces that 3-2-1 is to be cancelled as a regular series but will continue to be shown in a series of 'special' shows. An Olympics special and Christmas special are shown in 1988, but after that it is cancelled altogether.
- 18 December – Frank Bough, who launched breakfast television on 17 January 1983, presents Breakfast Time for the final time.
- 22 December – Channel 4 shows the 1983 Disney produced supernatural film Something Wicked This Way Comes, based on Ray Bradbury's novel and starring Jonathan Pryce and Jason Robards.
- 25 December
  - Christmas Day highlights on BBC1 include Julie Andrews.... The Sound of Christmas, a show featuring music and presented by Julie Andrews from Salzburg, Austria.
  - The network television premieres of Steven Spielberg's 1984 action-adventure sequel Indiana Jones and the Temple of Doom, with Harrison Ford and the 1983 Deborah Winger-starring family drama Terms of Endearment, both on BBC1.
  - ITV shows back to back network television premieres of two Disney films; the 1951 animated version of Alice in Wonderland and the Angela Lansbury starring 1971 musical fantasy Bedknobs and Broomsticks.
  - The final episode of the long-running comedy sketch show The Two Ronnies is broadcast on BBC1.
  - ITV enjoys a record-breaking audience when more than twenty-six million viewers tune in to the Christmas Day episode of Coronation Street in which Hilda Ogden (Jean Alexander) makes her last appearance in the show after 23 years.
- 26 December
  - The network television premiere of the 1984 supernatural comedy Ghostbusters on ITV, starring Bill Murray, Dan Aykroyd and Sigourney Weaver. This is the television edit of the film containing alternate takes to accommodate for a more family friendly viewing, such as Dan Aykroyd's profanity towards the character Walter Peck being changed to "Wally Wick".
  - The pilot episode of the comedy sketch show A Bit of Fry & Laurie airs on BBC1; a full series would begin in January 1989.
- 30 December – Channel 4 airs "Salute to ATV", an evening of programmes celebrating ATV which includes episodes of Sunday Night at the London Palladium, The Saint and Edward VII.
- 31 December
  - In an unusual move for a pre-recorded series, the chimes of Big Ben are integrated into an episode of EastEnders on BBC1. Character Den Watts (Leslie Grantham) brings a television into the bar of the "Queen Vic", 'watches' the chimes in their entirety and the episode resumes.
  - BBC2 airs a five-hour Whistle Test special to welcome in 1988 which airs from 9:35pm on New Year's Eve to 2:55am on New Year's Day. The special takes a look back through the archives in what is the programme's final outing. It will be three decades later in 2018 before a new edition of the programme is broadcast.
  - Frontcaps which are shown before programmes on ITV are used for the last time after 32 years.
  - The final edition of the long-running game show University Challenge, presented by Bamber Gascoigne, is broadcast on ITV. The series will return for a one-off episode on BBC2 in 1992 and then full-time in 1994 on the same channel, presented by Jeremy Paxman.
- December
  - The switching on of Channel 4 from all of the UK's television transmitters is completed when the relays at Cerne Abbas and Gunnislake have Channel 4 added.
  - Thamesside TV, an unlicensed television station set up by Thameside Radio, goes on the air in London. There are only two known broadcasts.

=== Unknown ===
- Network 21, an unlicensed television station in London, broadcasts for around 30 minutes on Friday evenings.
- Two separate government studies identify spare frequency space on the UHF band, prompting political debate about the viability of a fifth UK terrestrial television channel.
- Sir Richard Attenborough replaces Edmund Dell as Chairman of Channel 4.

== Debuts ==
=== BBC1 ===
- 2 January – ThunderCats (1985–1989)
- 3 January
  - Carrott Confidential (1987–1989)
  - Perfect Strangers (1986–1993)
- 4 January – The Diary of Anne Frank (1987)
- 9 January – Rockliffe's Babies (1987–1988)
- 12 January – Anzacs (1985)
- 21 January – Corners (1987–1991)
- 3 March – Tutti Frutti (1987)
- 4 March – The Raccoons (1985–1991)
- 8 March – The First Eden (1987)
- 12 March – Life Without George (1987–1989)
- 16 March – Alvin and the Chipmunks (1983–1990)
- 21 March – The Houseman's Tale (1987)
- 9 April – The Adventures of Spot (1987–1993)
- 17 April – Perry Mason Returns (1985–1993)
- 22 April – Best Of British (1987–1994)
- 25 June – Boogie Outlaws (1987)
- 5 September – Pulaski (1987)
- 6 September
  - The Happy Valley (1987)
  - Vanity Fair (1987)
- 8 September – You Must Be The Husband (1987–1988)
- 15 September – Bad Boyes (1987–1988)
- 17 September – Blackadder the Third (1987)
- 26 September
  - ChuckleVision (1987–2009)
  - Going Live! (1987–1993)
  - Double Dare (1987–1992)
- 5 October – Star Wars: Ewoks (1985–1986)
- 11 October – Fortunes of War (1987)
- 12 October – Going for Gold (BBC 1987–1996, Channel 5 2008–2009)
- 17 October – My Family and Other Animals (1987)
- 29 October – Around the World with Willy Fog (1983)
- 16 November – Simon and the Witch (1987–1988)
- 17 November – Fireman Sam

=== BBC2 ===
- 7 January – Filthy, Rich & Catflap (1987)
- 26 January – A Small Problem (1987)
- 15 February – Northanger Abbey (1987)
- 9 March – French and Saunders (1987–2007)
- 25 March – A Dorothy L. Sayers Mystery (1987)
- 22 April – Secret Society (1987)
- 24 April – The Ritz (1987)
- 14 May – The Celts (1987)
- 6 July – Star Cops (1987)
- 25 August – Brimstone and Treacle (originally made in 1976) (1987)
- 16 September – The Victorian Kitchen Garden (1987)
- 9 October – Sport on Friday (1987–1997)
- 4 November – A Perfect Spy (1987)
- 26 December – A Bit of Fry & Laurie (1987–1995)

=== ITV ===
- 5 January
  - Playbox (1987–1992)
  - The Growing Pains of Adrian Mole (1987)
- 6 January – Inspector Morse (1987–2000)
- 7 January
  - High & Dry (1987)
  - Sporting Triangles (1987–1990)
  - Creepy Crawlies (1987–1989)
  - Allsorts (1987–1995)
  - Y-E-S (1987)
- 9 January
  - My Husband and I (1987–1988)
  - Yesterday's Dreams (1987)
- 10 February – L.A. Law (1986–1994)
- 18 January – A Little Princess (1987)
- 15 February – Adventures of the Gummi Bears (1985–1991)
- 24 February – Hardwicke House (1987)
- 6 March – Running Wild (1987–1989)
- 9 March – Intimate Contact (1987)
- April – The Shoe People (1987)
- 3 April – Through the Keyhole (1987–2008, 2013–2019)
- 21 April – Dennis (1986–1988)
- 25 April – ALF (1986–1990)
- 26 April – Scoop (1987)
- 1 May – Matlock (1987–1997)
- 24 May – Tarby's Frame Game (1987–1989)
- 7 June – The Honey Siege (1987)
- 9 June
  - The Roxy (1987–1988)
  - America's Top 10 (1987–1992)
- 14 June – Floodtide (1987–1988)
- 19 June – Valentine Park (1987–1988)
- 1 July – Home James! (1987–1990)
- 5 July – Watching (1987–1993)
- 22 July – The Cook Report (1987–1999)
- 26 July – Shadow of the Stone (1987)
- 2 August – The Ruth Rendell Mysteries (1987–2000)
- 23 August – Shadow in a Landscape (1987)
- 28 August – Night Network (1987–1988)
- 4 September – Bust (1987–1988)
- 6 September
  - Knights of God (1987)
  - A Wreath of Roses (1987)
- 7 September
  - DuckTales (1987–1990)
  - Knightmare (1987–1994)
  - The Time, The Place (1987–1998)
  - Chain Letters (1987–1997)
- 9 September
  - The Adventures of Teddy Ruxpin (1986–1987)
  - Ffizz (1987–1989)
- 11 September – Wimpole Village (1987)
- 12 September – The Dame Edna Experience (1987–1989)
- 13 September – The New Statesman (1987–1994)
- 16 September – The Pondles (1987)
- 12 October – Runway (1987–1993)
- 16 October – The Bretts (1987–1988)
- 18 October – The Charmer (1987)
- 13 December – The Beiderbecke Tapes (1987)

=== Channel 4 ===
- 6 January – Tales of Little Women (1987)
- 9 January – The Last Resort with Jonathan Ross (1987–1988)
- 4 February – Up Line (1987)
- 4 March – Tickets for the Titanic (1987–1988)
- 18 March – The Media Show (1987–1991)
- 7 April – Lost Belongings (1987)
- 1 May – After Dark (1987–1997, BBC 2003)
- 3 May – Network 7 (1987–1988)
- 5 May – Hold the Dream (1987)
- 13 May – Brond (1987)
- 3 June – Porterhouse Blue (1987)
- 21 September – Business Daily (1987–1992)
- 4 October – Worzel Gummidge Down Under (1987–1989)
- 30 October – Dispatches (1987–present)
- 4 November – Damon and Debbie (1987)

=== The Children's Channel ===
- Unknown
  - Edward and Friends (1987)
  - Kaboodle (1987–1990)

== Channels ==
=== New channels ===
Date	Channel
30 January	Super Channel
1 August	MTV Europe
17 September	CNN International

=== Defunct channels ===
Date	Channel
30 January	Music Box
July	Star Channel

== Television shows ==
=== Returning this year after a break of one year or longer ===
- 21 March – Opportunity Knocks (1956–1978 ITV, 1987–1990 BBC)
- 27 June – Family Fortunes (1980–1985, 1987–2002, 2006–2015, 2020–2023)
- 5 October – Watch with Mother (1952–1975) (1987, 1989, 1993 VHS Only)

== Continuing television shows ==
=== 1920s ===
- BBC Wimbledon (1927–1939, 1946–2019, 2021–present)

=== 1930s ===
- Trooping the Colour (1937–1939, 1946–2019, 2023–present)
- The Boat Race (1938–1939, 1946–2019, 2021–present)
- BBC Cricket (1939, 1946–1999, 2020–2024)

=== 1940s ===
- Come Dancing (1949–1998)

=== 1950s ===
- What's My Line? (1951–1964, 1984–1996)
- Panorama (1953–present)
- What the Papers Say (1956–2008)
- The Sky at Night (1957–present)
- Blue Peter (1958–present)
- Grandstand (1958–2007)

=== 1960s ===
- Coronation Street (1960–present)
- Songs of Praise (1961–present)
- Doctor Who (1963–1989, 1996, 2005–present)
- World in Action (1963–1998)
- Top of the Pops (1964–2006)
- Match of the Day (1964–present)
- Crossroads (1964–1988, 2001–2003)
- Play School (1964–1988)
- Mr. and Mrs. (1965–1999)
- World of Sport (1965–1985)
- Jackanory (1965–1996, 2006)
- Sportsnight (1965–1997)
- Call My Bluff (1965–2005)
- The Money Programme (1966–2010)
- Reksio (1967–1990)
- The Big Match (1968–2002)

=== 1970s ===
- The Old Grey Whistle Test (1971–1987)
- The Two Ronnies (1971–1987, 1991, 1996, 2005)
- Pebble Mill at One (1972–1986)
- Rainbow (1972–1992, 1994–1997)
- Emmerdale (1972–present)
- Newsround (1972–present)
- Weekend World (1972–1988)
- We Are the Champions (1973–1987)
- Last of the Summer Wine (1973–2010)
- That's Life! (1973–1994)
- Wish You Were Here...? (1974–2003)
- Arena (1975–present)
- Jim'll Fix It (1975–1994)
- One Man and His Dog (1976–present)
- 3-2-1 (1978–1988)
- Grange Hill (1978–2008)
- Ski Sunday (1978–present)
- Terry and June (1979–1987)
- The Book Tower (1979–1989)
- Blankety Blank (1979–1990, 1997–2002)
- The Paul Daniels Magic Show (1979–1994)
- Antiques Roadshow (1979–present)
- Question Time (1979–present)

=== 1980s ===
- Play Your Cards Right (1980–1987, 1994–1999, 2002–2003)
- Family Fortunes (1980–2002, 2006–2015, 2020–present)
- Juliet Bravo (1980–1985)
- Cockleshell Bay (1980–1986)
- Children in Need (1980–present)
- Finders Keepers (1981–1985)
- Freetime (1981–1985)
- Game for a Laugh (1981–1985)
- Tenko (1981–1985)
- That's My Boy (1981–1986)
- Razzamatazz (1981–1987)
- Bergerac (1981–1991)
- Odd One Out (1982–1985)
- On Safari (1982–1985)
- 'Allo 'Allo! (1982–1992)
- Wogan (1982–1992)
- Saturday Superstore (1982–1987)
- The Tube (1982–1987)
- Brookside (1982–2003)
- Countdown (1982–present)
- Let's Pretend (TV series) (1982–1988)
- No. 73 (1982–1988)
- Timewatch (1982–present)
- Right to Reply (1982–2001)
- Up the Elephant and Round the Castle (1983–1985)
- Inspector Gadget (1983–1986)
- Bananaman (1983–1986)
- Just Good Friends (1983–1986)
- Philip Marlowe, Private Eye (1983–1986)
- Breadwinners (1983–1986)
- Breakfast Time (1983–1989)
- Dramarama (1983–1989)
- Don't Wait Up (1983–1990)
- Good Morning Britain (1983–1992)
- First Tuesday (1983–1993)
- Highway (1983–1993)
- Blockbusters (1983–93, 1994–95, 1997, 2000–01, 2012, 2019)

== Ending this year ==
- 2 January – Razzamatazz (1981–1987)
- 9 February – The Growing Pains of Adrian Mole (1987)
- 25 February – Up Line (1987)
- 9 March – Relative Strangers (1985–1987)
- 8 April – Jossy's Giants (1986–1987)
- 18 April – Saturday Superstore (1982–1987)
- 24 April – The Tube (1982–1987)
- 26 April – Asian Magazine (1982–1987)
- 28 April – Gharbar (1977–1987)
- 5 June – Drummonds (1985–1987)
- 6 June – C.A.T.S. Eyes (1985–1987)
- 15 July – How Dare You! (1984–1987)
- 19 July – The Honey Siege (1987)
- 13 August – We Are the Champions (1973–1987)
- 31 August – Terry and June (1979–1987)
- 22 November
  - Play Your Cards Right (1980–1987, 1994–1999, 2002–2003)
  - The Charmer (1987)
- 1 December – The Old Grey Whistle Test (1971–1987)
- 15 December – The Telebugs (1986–1987)
- 17 December – Chish 'n' Fips (1984–1987)
- 18 December – Victoria Wood As Seen On TV (1985–1987)
- 20 December – The Two Ronnies (1971–1987, 1991, 1996, 2005)
- 31 December
  - University Challenge (1962–1987 ITV, 1994–present BBC)
  - Tales of Little Women (1987)

== Births ==
- 9 January – Nicola Coughlan, actress
- 20 January – Mark Wright, television personality
- 9 March – Stacey Dooley, documentary presenter
- 29 March – Stephanie Parker, Welsh actress (died 2009)
- 1 May – Matt Di Angelo, actor
- 26 May – Aaron Chalmers, reality television personality and martial artist
- 3 June – Michelle Keegan, actress
- 5 June – Charlie Clements, actor
- 14 August – James Buckley, actor
- 3 September – Chris Fountain, actor
- 22 September – Tom Felton, actor
- 28 November – Karen Gillan, actress
- 28 December – Hannah Tointon, actress

== Deaths ==
Date	Name	Age	Cinematic Credibility
2 January	Arthur Gould-Porter	81	actor
25 January	William Devlin	75	actor (The Avengers)
4 February	Patrick Waddington	85	actor (Dad's Army)
19 February	Hugh Carleton Greene	76	television director
25 February	John Collin	58	actor (The Saint, Z-Cars)
9 March	Arthur Tolcher	64	harmonica player and co-actor (Morecambe and Wise)
11 March	Joe Gladwin	81	actor (Last of the Summer Wine)
18 March	Elizabeth Poston	81	theme tune composer
28 March	Patrick Troughton	67	actor (Doctor Who)
7 May	Colin Blakely	56	actor (King Lear, The Beiderbecke Affair, Paradise Postponed)
27 May	Cecil Madden	84	television producer
6 June	Fulton Mackay	64	actor (The Saint, The Avengers, Porridge, Fraggle Rock (as the only human))
13 July	Patience Collier	76	actress (Who Pays the Ferryman?, Sapphire & Steel)
15 July	Polly Elwes	59	television announcer
16 July	Alfie Bass	71	actor (Till Death Us Do Part, Are You Being Served?)
30 July	McDonald Hobley	70	continuity announcer
31 July	Michael Staniforth	44	actor (Rentaghost)
14 August	Sydney Bromley	78	actor
14 August	Brewster Mason	64	actor (The Pallisers, Quatermass, Tales of the Unexpected)
27 August	Joan Haythorne	72	actress (Thriller, Hadleigh)
1 September	Philip Friend	72	actor
7 September	Harry Locke	73	actor (Randall and Hopkirk (Deceased), War and Peace, Just William)
9 September	Bill Fraser	79	actor (Love Thy Neighbour, The Secret Diary of Adrian Mole, Rumpole of the Bailey)
11 September	Hugh David	62	television director
21 September	John Chandos	70	actor (The Avengers)
25 September	Emlyn Williams	81	dramatist and actor
30 September	Geoffrey Burridge	38	actor (Emmerdale Farm, Blake's 7)
8 October	Donald McWhinnie	66	television director
24 October	Raymond Francis	76	actor (No Hiding Place)
5 November	Eamonn Andrews	64	Irish born television presenter
23 November	Sarah Long	39	actress and television presenter
29 November	Irene Handl	85	actress (For the Love of Ada, Maggie and Her, Mapp and Lucia)

== See also ==
- 1987 in British music
- 1987 in British radio
- 1987 in the United Kingdom
- List of British films of 1987
