= Nai Zindagi Naya Jeevan =

British TV series (1968–1982)

- Presented by: Mahendra Kaul; Saleem Shahed
- Country of origin: United Kingdom
- Original languages: Hindi; Urdu

Production
- Running time: 30 minutes

Original release
- Network: BBC One
- Release: 24 October 1968 – 13 June 1982

Related
- Apna Hi Ghar Samajhiye; Asian Magazine

Nai Zindagi Naya Jeevan (New Life (Urdu) New Life (Hindi) (Note: The title was often incorrectly translated as 'New Way, New Life')) is a BBC television programme broadcast from 1968 until 1982.

It was the first major programme for Hindi and Urdu-speaking viewers, and represented the beginnings of regular broadcasting in the UK for non-native English speakers. Until that point, all BBC programmes had assumed an English or Welsh-speaking audience.

Each programme included domestic and international news (including that from the Indian sub-continent). Cultural and current affairs interviews were also included, and so were music performances. It was presented by Mahendra Kaul and Saleem Shahed, amongst others.

Usually broadcast at the beginning of programmes on BBC1 on Sundays, it was occasionally repeated on BBC Two during the week, and was produced in Birmingham. By the time of its demise in April 1982, the BBC Asian Programmes Unit (APU) was a well-established provider of Asian-language programmes across the BBC network.

Asian programmes on BBC television began 10 October 1965 on BBC One with In Logon Se Miliye ("Let me introduce you to these people"). In January 1966, this was replaced with Apna Hi Ghar Samajhiye ("Make Yourself at Home"), which also ran on Sunday mornings on BBC Radio 4. In November 1968 this programme was replaced on television with Nai Zindagi Naya Jeevan.

In 1977, a companion programme aimed at Asian women, Gharbar, was launched. The programme had only been intended to run for 26 weeks but continued for ten years, finally ending in April 1987.

A tribute to the television programme appeared on the top-twenty album Community Music (2000) by electronica band Asian Dub Foundation. The lyrics to the fourth song on the album, "New Way, New Life", credited numerous members of the band, who described growing up in families of Nai Zindagi Naya Jeevan fans.
