= 1987 in British music =

This is a summary of 1987 in music in the United Kingdom, including the official charts from that year.

== Summary ==
The start of the year saw an important milestone in electronic dance music, when Steve "Silk" Hurley's song "Jack Your Body" became the first house music track to reach number 1 in the UK charts. This was despite Hurley refusing to promote the song, and the 12-inch single technically breaking chart rules as it was longer than the allowed 25-minute play time. House music had been steadily growing in popularity since it started underground in the early 1980s, and another number 1 would follow in September, the huge selling "Pump Up The Volume" by British act MARRS (stylized M|A|R|R|S) which was one of the top ten biggest selling songs of the year.

For most of the 1980s, the main musical format in the charts was the gramophone record, with songs being released on both 7-inch and 12-inch vinyl singles. However, in 1987 two new formats started to appear. The first was the digital CD single, where songs are put on a Compact Disc. These were first made eligible for the UK Singles Chart this year, and the first number 1 to be released as a CD single was Whitney Houston's "I Wanna Dance with Somebody (Who Loves Me)" released in May. The second was the cassette single where the song is released on an audio tape – the BPI began recording their sales this year, but they would not become eligible until 1989. Both formats would dominate the chart throughout the 1990s.

Synthpop bands Pet Shop Boys and Erasure continued their success from their breakthrough year in 1986, with the Pet Shop Boys achieving their second number 1 single ("It's a Sin") in the summer, and two more top ten singles with "What Have I Done to Deserve This?", a collaboration with Dusty Springfield, which peaked at number 2, and "Rent", which peaked at number 8. Their album "Actually" also sold well and peaked at number 2. Erasure's album The Circus was their first charting album and peaked at number 6, and had two top 10 hits this year with the eponymous title track and "Victim of Love", as well as the number 12 charting "It Doesn't Have to Be" and their big hit from the previous year, "Sometimes". Both bands would continue to have huge success into the early 1990s.

The sound of producers Stock Aitken Waterman continued to grow in popularity, as they moved from their previous Hi-NRG sound to one more pop-based. It gave them big hits with girl group Bananarama, with their song "Love in the First Degree" becoming their biggest hit ever when it peaked at number 3, and British singer Sinitta with "Toy Boy", the successful No. 4 followup to the big selling song "So Macho" from 1986. They also achieved two number one's, one being girl duo Mel and Kim's "Respectable", and created a huge star with the baritone-voiced singer Rick Astley. In 1987 he had a number one album with "Whenever You Need Somebody", and several high charting singles including the title track and the biggest selling single of the year, his number 1 breakthrough song "Never Gonna Give You Up".

Madonna continued her long run of Top Ten hits throughout the year, scoring two number one's, "La Isla Bonita" in April and "Who's That Girl" in July; the former was her third number one single from the multi-million selling album True Blue and the latter was taken from the film of the same name in which Madonna herself starred. Although the film was critically panned, the soundtrack album hit a respectable No. 4 and generated two more Top 10 hits for Madonna; "Causing a Commotion" (No. 4, September) and "The Look of Love" (No. 9, December).

Soul singer Ben E. King got a surprise number 1 with a re-release of 1961's "Stand by Me", which was used in an advert for Levi Jeans. Long running band The Bee Gees also got their first number 1 of the decade with "You Win Again", their fifth overall in a 20-year career, and Michael Jackson released the multi-million selling "Bad" one of the highest selling albums in UK chart history. It spawned the number 1 single "I Just Can't Stop Loving You" (a duet with Siedah Garrett), the number 3 title track and the number 3 "The Way You Make Me Feel". The year also saw George Michael launch his solo career post-Wham! with the album "Faith" and its title track, which reached number 2.

The race for the Christmas number one single had many contenders this year. Rick Astley released a cover of "When I Fall In Love", and the 1956 Nat King Cole version was re-released at the same time, while 'Mel & Kim' released a cover of "Rockin' Around the Christmas Tree" – however, this referred to comedian Mel Smith and singer Kim Wilde rather than the girl group of the same name; proceeds went to the charity Comic Relief. A very popular Christmas song released this year was a collaboration with Irish band The Pogues and singer Kirsty MacColl, with the song "Fairytale of New York". With its bitter tale about the breakup of two lovers, it was very different from other Christmas songs around.

In the end, it was the Pet Shop Boys who had the Christmas number one of 1987, with their cover of Elvis Presley's "Always on My Mind". The Pogues peaked at number 2 and has been re-issued several times since, reaching the top 10 in 2005, 2006 and 2007.

In the world of classical music Nicholas Maw's new work Odyssey made an impact, and veteran composer Malcolm Arnold produced his Salute to Thomas Merritt, Op. 98, whilst Michael Nyman and Judith Weir both brought new operas to the stage. The BBC Cardiff Singer of the World competition was won by Italian soprano Valeria Esposito, and the Lieder prize was introduced into the competition for the first time.

== Events ==
- 5 January – Elton John undergoes throat surgery in Australia, ultimately resulting in his voice becoming permanently deeper.
- 13 January – The first performance of Symphony with Chaconne by Alexander Goehr takes places at Manchester's Free Trade Hall with Edward Downes and the BBC Philharmonic Orchestra.
- 9 March – The career that would end in an infamous appearance at the Brit Awards and the burning of a million pounds began with the Justified Ancients of Mu Mu releasing their debut single, "All You Need Is Love".
- 27 March – The Violin Concerto by Peter Dickinson is performed and broadcast for the first time by the BBC Philharmonic Orchestra, soloist Ernst Kovacic, conducted by Bryden Thomson.
- 24 April – Inquietus Op. 66 for orchestra by Robin Holloway is performed for the first time at Friends House, London.
- 24 April – The Tube is axed after five series and four and a half years.
- 9 May – Ireland's Johnny Logan wins the Eurovision Song Contest, held in Brussels, Belgium, with the song "Hold Me Now", making him the first artist to win the contest twice. The UK's entry, "Only the Light" by Rikki, finishes in 13th place.
- 19 May – An 80th birthday tribute concert for Miklós Rózsa is held at the Royal Festival Hall with fellow film composers Elmer Bernstein and Jerry Goldsmith. Ill-health prevented Rózsa from attending.
- 1 June – George Michael's single "I Want Your Sex" is banned by the BBC, except for post-watershed hours, and the video is also banned.
- June – Johnny Marr leaves the Smiths, and shortly after, the band splits up, just prior to the release of their final album Strangeways, Here We Come.
- 1 August – Dave Stewart of Eurythmics and Siobhan Fahey of Bananarama are married in Normandy, France.
- 22 August – The String Quartet No 3 by Sofia Gubaidulina is performed for the first time, in Queen's Hall, Edinburgh.
- 24 August – The first performance of Richard Rodney Bennett's Symphony No 3, his final (and favourite) symphony, takes place at Worcester Cathedral during the Three Choirs Festival (for which it was commissioned by the Elgar Foundation). It has been described as "a journey towards tonality". The composer's previous two symphonies were serial pieces.
- December – The Old Grey Whistle Test is axed and its last episode is aired on 1 January 1988.
- 23 December – Roger Waters officially leaves Pink Floyd, after a two-year legal dispute.

== Charts ==
=== Number one singles ===
| Chart date (week ending) | Song | Artist(s) | Weeks | Sales |
|---|---|---|---|---|
| 3 January | "Reet Petite" | Jackie Wilson | 3 | 143,837 |
| 10 January | "Reet Petite" | Jackie Wilson | 3 | 87,465 |
| 17 January | "Reet Petite" | Jackie Wilson | 3 | 60,044 |
| 24 January | "Jack Your Body" | Steve "Silk" Hurley | 2 | 50,762 |
| 31 January | "Jack Your Body" | Steve "Silk" Hurley | 2 | 66,334 |
| 7 February | "I Knew You Were Waiting (For Me)" | Aretha Franklin and George Michael | 2 | 94,588 |
| 14 February | "I Knew You Were Waiting (For Me)" | Aretha Franklin and George Michael | 2 | 102,425 |
| 21 February | "Stand by Me" | Ben E. King | 3 | 82,960 |
| 28 February | "Stand by Me" | Ben E. King | 3 | 139,621 |
| 7 March | "Stand by Me" | Ben E. King | 3 | 112,863 |
| 14 March | "Everything I Own" | Boy George | 2 | 69,870 |
| 21 March | "Everything I Own" | Boy George | 2 | 86,173 |
| 28 March | "Respectable" | Mel and Kim | 1 | 83,776 |
| 4 April | "Let It Be" | Ferry Aid | 3 | 165,529 |
| 11 April | "Let It Be" | Ferry Aid | 3 | 106,199 |
| 18 April | "Let It Be" | Ferry Aid | 3 | 57,120 |
| 25 April | "La Isla Bonita" | Madonna | 2 | 49,742 |
| 2 May | "La Isla Bonita" | Madonna | 2 | 47,107 |
| 9 May | "Nothing's Gonna Stop Us Now" | Starship | 4 | 67,898 |
| 16 May | "Nothing's Gonna Stop Us Now" | Starship | 4 | 99,280 |
| 23 May | "Nothing's Gonna Stop Us Now" | Starship | 4 | 110,738 |
| 30 May | "Nothing's Gonna Stop Us Now" | Starship | 4 | 116,144 |
| 6 June | "I Wanna Dance With Somebody (Who Loves Me)" | Whitney Houston | 2 | 96,254 |
| 13 June | "I Wanna Dance With Somebody (Who Loves Me)" | Whitney Houston | 2 | 102,408 |
| 20 June | "Star Trekkin'" | The Firm | 2 | 105,060 |
| 27 June | "Star Trekkin'" | The Firm | 2 | 121,261 |
| 4 July | "It's a Sin" | Pet Shop Boys | 3 | 84,983 |
| 11 July | "It's a Sin" | Pet Shop Boys | 3 | 90,661 |
| 18 July | "It's a Sin" | Pet Shop Boys | 3 | 76,347 |
| 25 July | "Who's That Girl" | Madonna | 1 | 75,922 |
| 1 August | "La Bamba" | Los Lobos | 2 | 73,780 |
| 8 August | "La Bamba" | Los Lobos | 2 | 80,223 |
| 15 August | "I Just Can't Stop Loving You" | Michael Jackson with Siedah Garrett | 2 | 63,631 |
| 22 August | "I Just Can't Stop Loving You" | Michael Jackson with Siedah Garrett | 2 | 66,215 |
| 29 August | "Never Gonna Give You Up" | Rick Astley | 5 | 78,574 |
| 5 September | "Never Gonna Give You Up" | Rick Astley | 5 | 135,354 |
| 12 September | "Never Gonna Give You Up" | Rick Astley | 5 | 111,639 |
| 19 September | "Never Gonna Give You Up" | Rick Astley | 5 | 97,699 |
| 26 September | "Never Gonna Give You Up" | Rick Astley | 5 | 80,189 |
| 3 October | "Pump Up the Volume"/"Anitiиa (The First Time I See She Dance)" | MARRS | 2 | 70,992 |
| 10 October | "Pump Up the Volume"/"Anitiиa (The First Time I See She Dance)" | MARRS | 2 | 66,674 |
| 17 October | "You Win Again" | Bee Gees | 4 | 60,724 |
| 24 October | "You Win Again" | Bee Gees | 4 | 109,123 |
| 31 October | "You Win Again" | Bee Gees | 4 | 101,745 |
| 7 November | "You Win Again" | Bee Gees | 4 | 87,108 |
| 14 November | "China in Your Hand" | T'Pau | 5 | 66,453 |
| 21 November | "China in Your Hand" | T'Pau | 5 | 96,322 |
| 28 November | "China in Your Hand" | T'Pau | 5 | 71,978 |
| 5 December | "China in Your Hand" | T'Pau | 5 | 61,693 |
| 12 December | "China in Your Hand" | T'Pau | 5 | 50,813 |
| 19 December | "Always on My Mind" | Pet Shop Boys | 2 | 87,669 |
| 26 December | "Always on My Mind" | Pet Shop Boys | 2 | 112,217 |

=== Number one albums ===
| Chart date (week ending) | Album | Artist(s) | Weeks |
|---|---|---|---|
| 3 January | Now 8 | Various Artists | 2 |
| 10 January | Now 8 | Various Artists | 2 |
| 17 January | The Whole Story | Kate Bush | 2 |
| 24 January | The Whole Story | Kate Bush | 2 |
| 31 January | Graceland | Paul Simon | 3 |
| 7 February | Graceland | Paul Simon | 3 |
| 14 February | Graceland | Paul Simon | 3 |
| 21 February | The Phantom of the Opera | Original London Cast | 3 |
| 28 February | The Phantom of the Opera | Original London Cast | 3 |
| 7 March | The Phantom of the Opera | Original London Cast | 3 |
| 14 March | The Very Best of Hot Chocolate | Hot Chocolate | 1 |
| 21 March | The Joshua Tree | U2 | 2 |
| 28 March | The Joshua Tree | U2 | 2 |
| 4 April | Now 9 | Various Artists | 5 |
| 11 April | Now 9 | Various Artists | 5 |
| 18 April | Now 9 | Various Artists | 5 |
| 25 April | Now 9 | Various Artists | 5 |
| 2 May | Now 9 | Various Artists | 5 |
| 9 May | Keep Your Distance | Curiosity Killed the Cat | 2 |
| 16 May | Keep Your Distance | Curiosity Killed the Cat | 2 |
| 23 May | It's Better to Travel | Swing Out Sister | 2 |
| 30 May | It's Better to Travel | Swing Out Sister | 2 |
| 6 June | Live in the City of Light | Simple Minds | 1 |
| 13 June | Whitney | Whitney Houston | 6 |
| 20 June | Whitney | Whitney Houston | 6 |
| 27 June | Whitney | Whitney Houston | 6 |
| 4 July | Whitney | Whitney Houston | 6 |
| 11 July | Whitney | Whitney Houston | 6 |
| 18 July | Whitney | Whitney Houston | 6 |
| 25 July | Introducing the Hardline According to Terence Trent D'Arby | Terence Trent D'Arby | 1 |
| 1 August | Hits 6 | Various Artists | 4 |
| 8 August | Hits 6 | Various Artists | 4 |
| 15 August | Hits 6 | Various Artists | 4 |
| 22 August | Hits 6 | Various Artists | 4 |
| 29 August | Hysteria | Def Leppard | 1 |
| 5 September | Hits 6 | Various Artists | 1 |
| 12 September | Bad | Michael Jackson | 5 |
| 19 September | Bad | Michael Jackson | 5 |
| 26 September | Bad | Michael Jackson | 5 |
| 3 October | Bad | Michael Jackson | 5 |
| 10 October | Bad | Michael Jackson | 5 |
| 17 October | Tunnel of Love | Bruce Springsteen | 1 |
| 24 October | ...Nothing Like the Sun | Sting | 1 |
| 31 October | Tango in the Night | Fleetwood Mac | 2 |
| 7 November | Tango in the Night | Fleetwood Mac | 2 |
| 14 November | Faith | George Michael | 1 |
| 21 November | Bridge of Spies | T'Pau | 1 |
| 28 November | Whenever You Need Somebody | Rick Astley | 1 |
| 5 December | Now 10 | Various Artists | 4 |
| 12 December | Now 10 | Various Artists | 4 |
| 19 December | Now 10 | Various Artists | 4 |
| 26 December | Now 10 | Various Artists | 4 |

== Year-end charts ==
=== Best-selling singles ===
| No. | Title | Artist | Peak position | Estimated sales |
|---|---|---|---|---|
| 1 | "Never Gonna Give You Up" | Rick Astley | 1 | 810,000 |
| 2 | "Nothing's Gonna Stop Us Now" | Starship | 1 | 740,000 |
| 3 | "I Wanna Dance with Somebody (Who Loves Me)" | Whitney Houston | 1 | 640,000 |
| 4 | "You Win Again" | Bee Gees | 1 | 590,000 |
| 5 | "China in Your Hand" | T'Pau | 1 | 570,000 |
| 6 | "Respectable" | Mel and Kim | 1 | 570,000 |
| 7 | "Stand by Me" | Ben E. King | 1 | 530,000 |
| 8 | "It's a Sin" | Pet Shop Boys | 1 | 475,000 |
| 9 | "Star Trekkin'" | The Firm | 1 | 470,000 |
| 10 | "Pump Up the Volume" / "Anitiиa (The First Time I See She Dance)" | MARRS | 1 | 450,000 |
| 11 | "I Knew You Were Waiting (For Me)" | George Michael and Aretha Franklin | 1 | |
| 12 | "Under the Boardwalk" | Bruce Willis | 2 | |
| 13 | "Let It Be" | Ferry Aid | 1 | |
| 14 | "Always on My Mind" | Pet Shop Boys | 1 | 430,000 |
| 15 | "Got My Mind Set on You" | George Harrison | 2 | |
| 16 | "Can't Be with You Tonight" | Judy Boucher | 2 | |
| 17 | "La Isla Bonita" | Madonna | 1 | |
| 18 | "La Bamba" | Los Lobos | 1 | |
| 19 | "Hold Me Now" | Johnny Logan | 2 | |
| 20 | "Who's That Girl" | Madonna | 1 | |
| 21 | "Everything I Own" | Boy George | 1 | |
| 22 | "Down to Earth" | Curiosity Killed the Cat | 3 | |
| 23 | "When a Man Loves a Woman" | Percy Sledge | 2 | |
| 24 | "Heartache" | Pepsi & Shirlie | 2 | |
| 25 | "Always" | Atlantic Starr | 3 | |
| 26 | "Whenever You Need Somebody" | Rick Astley | 3 | |
| 27 | "Toy Boy" | Sinitta | 4 | |
| 28 | "I Get the Sweetest Feeling" | Jackie Wilson | 3 | |
| 29 | "Faith" | George Michael | 2 | |
| 30 | "I Just Can't Stop Loving You" | Michael Jackson featuring Siedah Garrett | 1 | |
| 31 | "Live It Up" | Mental As Anything | 3 | |
| 32 | "Love in the First Degree" | Bananarama | 3 | |
| 33 | "Crockett's Theme | Jan Hammer | 2 | |
| 34 | "Alone" | Heart | 3 | |
| 35 | "Wipe Out" | The Fat Boys and The Beach Boys | 2 | |
| 36 | "Call Me" | Spagna | 2 | |
| 37 | "Let's Wait Awhile" | Janet Jackson | 3 | |
| 38 | "Jack Your Body" | Steve 'Silk' Hurley | 1 | |
| 39 | "The Great Pretender" | Freddie Mercury | 4 | |
| 40 | "Male Stripper" | Man 2 Man meets Man Parrish | 4 | |
| 41 | "Lean on Me" | Club Nouveau | 3 | |
| 42 | "What Have I Done to Deserve This?" | Pet Shop Boys with Dusty Springfield | 2 | |
| 43 | "Some People" | Cliff Richard | 3 | |
| 44 | "A Boy from Nowhere" | Tom Jones | 2 | |
| 45 | "With or Without You" | U2 | 4 | |
| 46 | "Wishing Well" | Terence Trent D'Arby | 4 | |
| 47 | "Heart and Soul" | T'Pau | 4 | |
| 48 | "Fairytale of New York" | The Pogues featuring Kirsty MacColl | 2 | |
| 49 | "Full Metal Jacket (I Wanna Be Your Drill Instructor)" | Abigail Mead and Nigel Goulding | 2 | |
| 50 | "When I Fall in Love"/"My Arms Keep Missing You" | Rick Astley | 2 | |

=== Best-selling albums ===
| No. | Title | Artist | Peak position | Estimated sales |
|---|---|---|---|---|
| 1 | Bad | Michael Jackson | 1 | 1,650,000 |
| 2 | The Joshua Tree | U2 | 1 | 1,450,000 |
| 3 | Whitney | Whitney Houston | 1 | 1,280,000 |
| 4 | Now 10 | Various Artists | 1 | 1,075,000 |
| 5 | Hits 6 | Various Artists | 1 | 1,050,000 |
| 6 | Tango in the Night | Fleetwood Mac | 1 | 920,000 |
| 7 | Whenever You Need Somebody | Rick Astley | 1 | 850,000 |
| 8 | Bridge of Spies | T'Pau | 1 | 780,000 |
| 9 | The Phantom of the Opera | Original London Cast | 1 | 735,000 |
| 10 | Hits 7 | Various Artists | 2 | 695,000 |
| 11 | Running in the Family | Level 42 | 2 | |
| 12 | Now 9 | Various Artists | 1 | |
| 13 | Raindancing | Alison Moyet | 2 | |
| 14 | Graceland | Paul Simon | 1 | |
| 15 | Actually | Pet Shop Boys | 2 | |
| 16 | Introducing the Hardline According to Terence Trent D'Arby | Terence Trent D'Arby | 1 | |
| 17 | All the Best! | Paul McCartney | 2 | |
| 18 | Invisible Touch | Genesis | 2 (Note: Reached number 1 in 1986) | |
| 19 | Men and Women | Simply Red | 2 | |
| 20 | The Best of UB40 – Volume One | UB40 | 3 | |
| 21 | True Blue | Madonna | 2 (Note: Reached number 1 in 1986) | |
| 22 | Live in the City of Light | Simple Minds | 1 | |
| 23 | The Singles | The Pretenders | 6 | |
| 24 | Keep Your Distance | Curiosity Killed the Cat | 1 | |
| 25 | Faith | George Michael | 1 | |
| 26 | The Cream of Eric Clapton | Eric Clapton | 3 | |
| 27 | Solitude Standing | Suzanne Vega | 2 | |
| 28 | Always Guaranteed | Cliff Richard | 5 | |
| 29 | The Very Best of Hot Chocolate | Hot Chocolate | 1 | |
| 30 | Sixties Mix | Various Artists | 3 | |
| 31 | The Circus | Erasure | 6 | |
| 32 | Give Me the Reason | Luther Vandross | 9 (Note: Reached number 3 in 1988) | |
| 33 | Silk & Steel | Five Star | 5 (Note: Reached number 1 in 1986) | |
| 34 | Hysteria | Def Leppard | 1 | |
| 35 | F.L.M. | Mel and Kim | 3 | |
| 36 | Brothers in Arms | Dire Straits | 11 (Note: Reached number 1 in 1985) | |
| 37 | Popped In Souled Out | Wet Wet Wet | 2 (Note: Reached number 1 in 1988) | |
| 38 | So | Peter Gabriel | 6 (Note: Reached number 1 in 1986) | |
| 39 | Whitesnake 1987 | Whitesnake | 8 | |
| 40 | It's Better to Travel | Swing Out Sister | 1 | |
| 41 | Who's That Girl | Original Soundtrack | 4 | |
| 42 | Simply Shadows | The Shadows | 7 | |
| 43 | You Can Dance | Madonna | 5 | |
| 44 | Dancing with Strangers | Chris Rea | 2 | |
| 45 | The Return of Bruno | Bruce Willis | 4 | |
| 46 | Bad Animals | Heart | 7 | |
| 47 | Hearsay | Alexander O'Neal | 10 (Note: Reached number 4 in 1988) | |
| 48 | Move Closer | Various Artists | 4 | |
| 49 | Tunnel of Love | Bruce Springsteen | 1 | |
| 50 | Licensed to Ill | Beastie Boys | 7 | |

== Classical music ==
- Richard Rodney Bennett – Symphony No. 3
- Robin Holloway – Brass Quintet: Divertimento No. 5, Op. 67
- Nicholas Maw – Odyssey (1973–87)

== Opera ==
- Peter Maxwell Davies – Resurrection
- Nigel Osborne – The Electrification of the Soviet Union
- Judith Weir – A Night at the Chinese Opera.

== Musical films ==
- Aria
- The Hunting of the Snark

== Births ==
- 9 January – Paolo Nutini, singer, songwriter
- 31 January – Marcus Mumford, singer-songwriter (Mumford & Sons)
- 5 February – Richard Rawson, rapper and songwriter
- 9 February – Sam Coulson, guitarist (Asia)
- 11 March – Timothy Furse, musician (The Horrors)
- 2 April – Molly Smitten-Downes, singer-songwriter
- 11 April – Joss Stone, singer
- 20 May – Fra Fee, singer and actor
- 4 June – Mollie King, singer (The Saturdays)
- 6 June – Kyle Falconer, musician (The View)
- 28 June – Bailey Tzuke, singer-songwriter
- 6 July – Kate Nash, singer, songwriter
- 19 July – Nicola Benedetti, violinist
- 25 August – Amy Macdonald, singer-songwriter
- 30 November – Dougie Poynter, musician (McFly)

== Deaths ==
- 3 January – Alex Campbell, folk singer, 61
- 10 January – Marion Hutton, singer and actress, 67
- 18 January – George Thalben-Ball, Australian-born organist and composer, 90
- 2 February – Spike Hughes, jazz musician, 78
- 7 March – Evelyn Dove, singer, 85
- 9 March – Arthur Tolcher, harmonica player, 64
- 13 March – Gerald Moore, pianist, 87
- 18 March – Elizabeth Poston, composer, 81
- 29 March – Florence Margaret Spencer Palmer, composer, 86
- 13 May – Forbes Robinson, operatic bass, 60
- 24 May – Hermione Gingold, actress and singer, 89
- 29 May – Phyllis Tate, composer, 76
- 1 July – Snakefinger, musician, singer and songwriter, 38 (heart attack)
- 15 July – Pete King, rock drummer, 28 (cancer)
- 22 July – Roger Fiske, musicologist, 76
- 9 August – Terrence Michael Walsh, singer-songwriter, 33 (overdose)
- 16 August – Peter Schidlof, Austrian-born violinist, 65
- 24 August – Douglas Byng, comic singer and songwriter, 94
- 8 September – Robert Sharples, conductor, 74
- 23 September – Louis Kentner, Austrian-born pianist, 82
- 3 October – Hans Gál, Austrian-born composer, 97
- 19 October – Jacqueline du Pré, cellist, 42 (multiple sclerosis)
- 3 November – Albert McCarthy, musicologist, 67
- 23 November – Eddie Freeman, jazz musician, 78
- 3 December – Marjorie Eyre, operatic soprano, 90
- 24 December – Manoug Parikian, violinist, 67
- 29 December – Frank Llewellyn Harrison, musicologist, 82

== Music awards ==
=== BRIT Awards ===
The 1987 BRIT Awards winners were:

- Best British Producer: Dave Stewart
- Best Classical Recording: Julian Lloyd Webber/Royal Philharmonic Orchestra "Elgar Cello Concerto"
- Best International Solo Artist: Paul Simon
- Best Soundtrack: Top Gun
- British Album: Dire Straits – Brothers in Arms
- British Breakthrough Act: The Housemartins
- British Female Solo Artist: Kate Bush
- British Group: Five Star
- British Male Solo Artist: Peter Gabriel
- British Single: Pet Shop Boys – "West End Girls"
- British Video: Peter Gabriel – "Sledgehammer"
- International Group: The Bangles
- Outstanding Contribution: Eric Clapton

=== Ivor Novello Awards ===
- Best International Hit: Pet Shop Boys – "West End Girls"
- Outstanding Contribution to British Music: Queen
- Outstanding Services to British Music: Yehudi Menuhin
- Songwriter of the Year: Stock Aitken Waterman

== See also ==
- 1987 in British radio
- 1987 in British television
- 1987 in the United Kingdom
- List of British films of 1987
