= Apna Hi Ghar Samajhiye =

British TV and radio programme (1965–1968)

Coordinates: 30.86407°N 74.73569°E

- Presented by: Mahendra Kaul; Saleem Shahed
- Theme music composer: Shiv Dayal Batish
- Country of origin: United Kingdom
- Original languages: Hindi; Urdu

Production
- Running time: 30 minutes

Original release
- Network: BBC1
- Release: 4 October 1965 – 17 October 1968

Apna Hi Ghar Samajhiye ('Make Yourself at Home') is a now-defunct BBC television and radio programme, presented in Hindustani, with the aim of helping immigrants from South Asia to the United Kingdom to become integrated.

The programme was announced on 4 October 1965.

== Television programme ==
The first episode was broadcast at 9 am on Sunday 10 October 1965 as "In Logon Se Miliye" 'Let Me Introduce You'. In January 1966 this was altered to Apna Hi Ghar Samajhiye 'Make Yourself at Home'. In 1966 it was presented by Mahendra Kaul, with Saleem Shahed. The theme song was composed and sung by Shiv Dayal Batish. In November 1968 there was another title change to Nai Zindagi Naya Jeevan 'New Way, New Life'. This was then replaced in June 1982 with Asian Magazine which ran until April 1987 which, along with companion programme Gharbar, ended ahead of the launch of a new single Saturday afternoon programme Network East in July 1987.

== Radio programme ==
The first episode was broadcast on the same day on the BBC Home Service. It continued to be broadcast on BBC Radio 4 until 28 December 1986 and throughout its 20 years on air it was called Apna Hi Ghar Samajhiye.
