= 1987 in British radio =

This is a list of events in British radio during 1987.

== Events ==
=== January ===
- 1 January – At midday, a new transmitter for Radio 210 is switched on. this occurs after the Independent Broadcasting Authority expands the stations's licence area to broadcast across Berkshire and north Hampshire.
- 3 January – BBC Radio 4’s Today programme launches a Saturday edition. The Saturday programme begins at 7 am, 30 minutes later than the weekday editions.
- early January – Sport bulletins are broadcast on BBC Radio 2 at breakfast for the first time. Previously, apart from a racing bulletin, sports news did not commence until lunchtime.
- 17 January – Johnnie Walker returns to BBC Radio 1 to present a new Saturday afternoon programme The Stereo Sequence. The programme, which runs for 5½ hours, incorporates the previous stand-alone Saturday afternoon shows, including the weekly look at the American charts.

=== February ===
- 9 February – BBC Radio 3 launches a twice daily news bulletin from the BBC World Service. The bulletins last for less than a year and are scrapped at the start of 1988.

=== March ===
- 3 March – Radio Trent's broadcast area expands when it starts broadcasting to Derbyshire.

=== May ===
- 18 May – The Yorkshire Radio Network launches. It is a networked service of evening and overnight programming, broadcast on three commercial radio stations in Yorkshire – Pennine Radio in Bradford, Viking Radio in Hull and Radio Hallam in Sheffield – providing programming every night between 8 pm (slightly earlier at weekends) and 6 am.
- 22 May – GWR's broadcast area expands when it launches in Bath.

=== July ===
- July – The European-wide re-organisation of band 2 of the VHF band comes into effect. It allows the full broadcasting spectrum to be available for broadcasting.
- 14 July – Beacon Radio's broadcast area is increased when it starts to broadcast to Shrewsbury and Telford.
- 17 July – John Timpson chairs Any Questions? for the final time.

=== September ===
- 4 September – Jonathan Dimbleby chairs Any Questions? for the first time.
- September
  - Just over a year after the BBC's four local radio stations in Yorkshire launched an early evening series of specialist music programmes, the service is expanded. Programmes are broadcast on six nights a week (Wednesday to Monday) and the length of each programme is increased by 30 minutes. Consequently, the four stations now stay on air into the mid evening as the programmes are transmitted between 7 pm and 9 pm.
  - Capital London is relaunched with a contemporary hit radio format.
  - Jenni Murray becomes a regular BBC Radio 4 Woman's Hour presenter.

=== October ===
- 1 October – Territorial Sea Act (passed 15 May) comes into effect, extending UK territorial waters to 12 nautical miles, further restricting offshore pirate radio in the United Kingdom.
- 4 October – From this day, the new UK Singles Chart is released on BBC Radio 1's Sunday afternoon chart show. Previously, the programme had played songs from the chart which had been released the previous Tuesday.
- 5 October – Manx Radio completes a deal with United Christian Broadcasters (UCB) which sees UCB broadcast via Manx Radio for an hour on Sunday evenings on Manx Radio's AM transmitter.
- 9 October – Radio 1 launches a new weekly Friday evening dance music programme, presented by Jeff Young.
- 27 October – BBC Radio 4 launches a new twice-weekly soap opera called Citizens.
- 31 October – BBC Radio 1 begins launching its FM frequency starting in London.

=== November ===
- 6–8 November – Radio 1 hosts a Birthday Weekender at Pontins Prestatyn in North Wales to mark its 20th anniversary. The event features various DJs presenting their programme from the venue across the weekend The event concludes with a special live performance by The Communards
- 8 November – Bruno Brookes reveals the 600th UK No. 1 single on the Radio 1 Chart Show as "China in Your Hand" by T'Pau. To mark the musical milestone, over the next three weeks Radio 1 plays all 600 singles to have reached number one since the UK Singles Chart was launched in 1952.

=== December ===
- 6 December – Ocean Sound launches on a new frequency to cover Winchester and the north of its region, as reception in this area is rather poor from the 103.2 FM transmitter on Chillerton Down on the Isle of Wight. Ocean Sound North on 96.7 FM shares much of its programming with Ocean Sound West, except for a local breakfast show.

=== Unknown ===
- Late in year – Downtown Radio begins broadcasting to the Enniskillen and Omagh areas of Northern Ireland and to coincide with its expanded broadcast area, the station briefly rebrands itself as 'DTRFM'.

== Station debuts ==
- September – BBC 648 (1987–2011)

== Programme debuts ==
- 20 April – Flying the Flag on BBC Radio 4 (1987–1992)
- 27 October – Citizens on BBC Radio 4 (1987–1991)
- October – Could Do Better on BBC Radio 4 (1987)
- 7 November – Up the Garden Path on BBC Radio 4 (1987–1993)

== Continuing radio programmes ==
=== 1940s ===
- Sunday Half Hour (1940–2018)
- Desert Island Discs (1942–Present)
- Down Your Way (1946–1992)
- Letter from America (1946–2004)
- Woman's Hour (1946–Present)
- A Book at Bedtime (1949–Present)

=== 1950s ===
- The Archers (1950–Present)
- The Today Programme (1957–Present)
- Sing Something Simple (1959–2001)
- Your Hundred Best Tunes (1959–2007)

=== 1960s ===
- Farming Today (1960–Present)
- In Touch (1961–Present)
- The World at One (1965–Present)
- The Official Chart (1967–Present)
- Just a Minute (1967–Present)
- The Living World (1968–Present)
- The Organist Entertains (1969–2018)

=== 1970s ===
- PM (1970–Present)
- Start the Week (1970–Present)
- Week Ending (1970–1998)
- You and Yours (1970–Present)
- I'm Sorry I Haven't a Clue (1972–Present)
- Good Morning Scotland (1973–Present)
- Kaleidoscope (1973–1998)
- Newsbeat (1973–Present)
- The News Huddlines (1975–2001)
- File on 4 (1977–Present)
- Money Box (1977–Present)
- The News Quiz (1977–Present)
- Breakaway (1979–1998)
- Feedback (1979–Present)
- The Food Programme (1979–Present)
- Science in Action (1979–Present)

=== 1980s ===
- In Business (1983–Present)
- Sounds of the 60s (1983–Present)
- After Henry (1985–1989)
- Loose Ends (1986–Present)

== Ending this year ==
- 17 October – Radio Active (1980–1987)
- Unknown – Delve Special (1984–1987)

== Births ==
- 30 January – Phil Lester, YouTuber and radio presenter
- 4 June – Mollie King, pop singer-songwriter and broadcast presenter
- 14 July – Danny Howard, dance music DJ

== Deaths ==
- 4 February – Wynford Vaughan-Thomas, Welsh news broadcaster (b. 1908)
- 6 September – Sir William Haley, Director-General of the BBC, 1944–1952 (b. 1901)
- 9 September – Al Read, comic (b. 1909)
- 1 October – Douglas Cleverdon, radio producer (b. 1903)
- Janet Quigley, radio executive (b. 1902)

== See also ==
- 1987 in British music
- 1987 in British television
- 1987 in the United Kingdom
- List of British films of 1987
