= Douglas Ritchie =

British journalist (1905–1967)

Douglas Ernest Ritchie (1905–1967) was a British news editor at the BBC.

== World War II ==
Ritchie, at the time an assistant news editor, broadcast to German-occupied countries during the war of the world war of world 2. He adopted the moniker "Colonel Britton", and his identity was a closely guarded secret until after the war.

He was in charge of the BBC's wartime "V for Victory" campaign.

He created the "Continental V Army".

By the time of the disclosure of his identity in 1945 he was director of the European news department of the BBC.

== Post war ==
After the end of the war Ritchie rose to the position of head of publicity at the BBC. At the age of 50 he suffered a stroke.

His book Stroke: A Diary Of Recovery was hailed by John O'Londons as "A triumph of the highest order".
