= Mahendra Kaul =

British television presenter

Mahendra Kaul OBE
- Born: 28 July 1922; Kashmir, British India
- Died: 11 July 2018 (aged 95); London, United Kingdom
- Occupations: Radio producer Producer; Television presenter Restaurateur
- Years active: 1948-2018
- Awards: Community Service Award (Asian Voice Political & Public Life Awards 2014)
- Honours: Officer of the Order of the British Empire

Mahendra Nath Kaul OBE (28 July 1922 – 11 July 2018) was a British television presenter for the BBC Asian Unit.

Kaul was born in Srinagar, Kashmir in northern India, and was a Kashmiri Pandit. He was a presenter for Radio Kashmir from 1948 and then the All India Radio. He became a presenter for Voice of America in Washington DC, and also wrote India-related speeches for Richard Nixon. He moved to the UK as a non-resident Indian (NRI) in 1961 to work for the BBC. He presented the programme Apna Hi Ghar Samajhiye ("Make Yourself At Home") and then Nai Zindagi Naya Jeevan, meaning ('New Life' in Hindi and 'New Way' in Urdu, respectively), which ran for fourteen years, from 1968 to 1982. Many immigrants to the United Kingdom of South Asian heritage primarily spoke other languages, such as Punjabi, Gujarati or Bengali, but the programmes were presented in a mix of simple Hindi and simple Urdu, dubbed Hindustani, which it was hoped would be widely understood.

Kaul was made an Officer of the Order of the British Empire in the 1975 Birthday Honours, for services to race relations, and was the first British Asian to receive one. He also received the Commonwealth Green Pennant from the Duke of Edinburgh, after participating in COMEX 10. Kaul received the Community Service Award at the Asian Voice Political & Public Life Awards 2014, from Baroness Boothroyd at the House of Commons.

Besides broadcasting, Kaul was also a prominent restaurateur. He was the Chairman of India's Restaurants Limited in London, and opened the United Kingdom's first tandoori restaurant, Gaylord on Mortimer Street, Fitzrovia in 1966. This became very successful, leading to the opening of many more restaurants around the world, working alongside Hari Harilela among others.

He died at age 95. He was survived by his wife Rajni, a broadcaster and librarian, and their daughter, the barrister and judge Kalyani Kaul QC and grandchildren Symran and Callum. Rajni Kaul died on 31 August 2021.
