= Anita Owen =

American songwriter

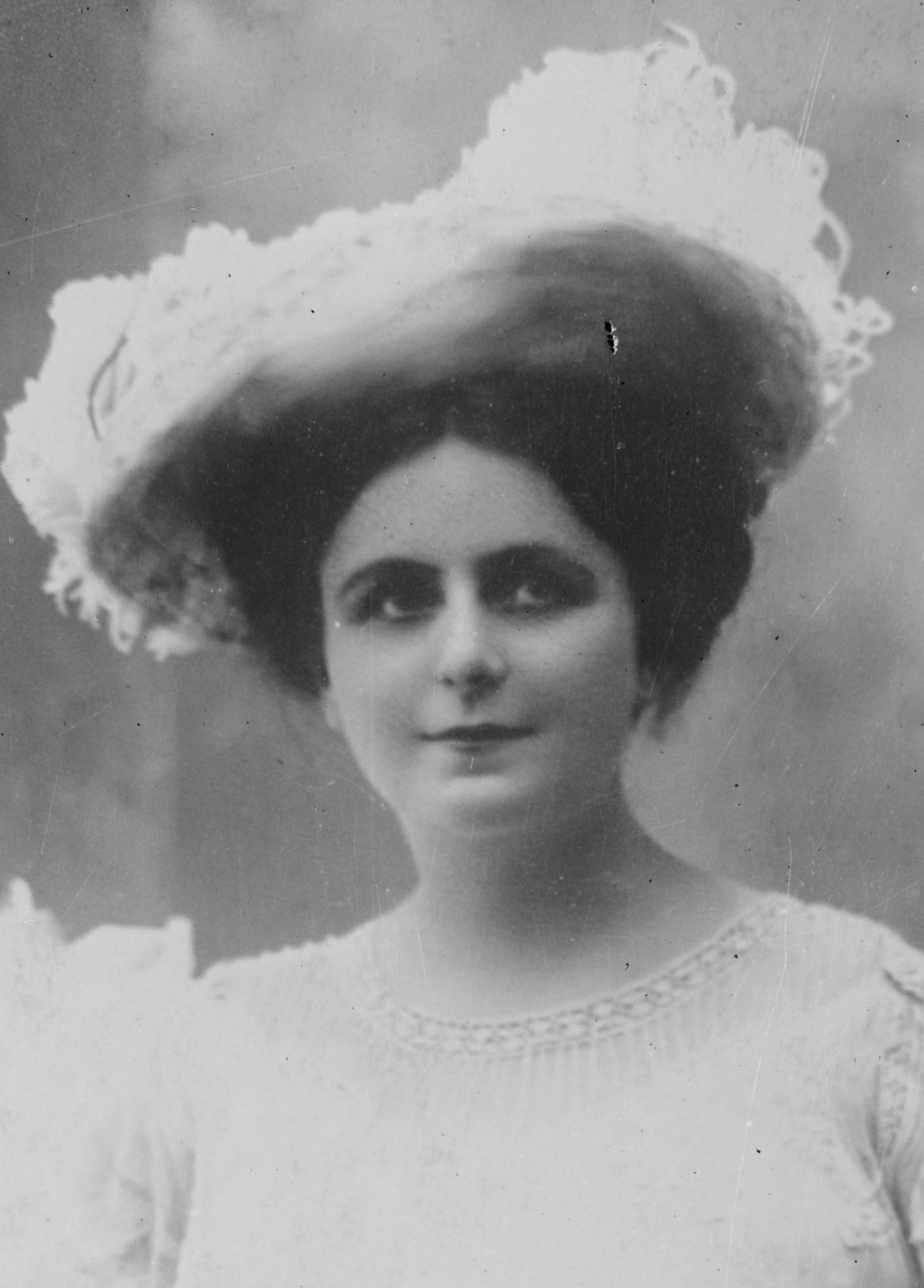
- Born: November 1873; Brazil, Indiana, U.S.
- Died: October 25, 1932 (age 58); New Haven, Connecticut, U.S.
- Education: Saint Mary-of-the-Woods College
- Occupations: Songwriter, composer, businesswoman

Esther Anita Owen Jones (November 1873 – October 25, 1932) was an American composer and songwriter, best known for her 1894 song "Sweet Bunch of Daisies," which sold over one million copies. She published her first song at age 15 or 16, and became one of the most popular female songwriters of her generation, known especially for flower-themed songs.

== Early life and education ==
Owen was born in Brazil, Indiana, the daughter of John Dale Owen and Louisa Hughes Owen. Her father was born in Wales and worked as a piano tuner. She attended Saint Mary-of-the-Woods College.

== Career ==
Owen began writing songs in her youth, and performed as a singer in Chicago as a young woman. Her father helped set up a publishing company in Chicago, Wabash Music Company, to publish her own songs. She sold the company to publisher Jerome H. Remick in 1908. She and her assistant Hattie Von Bulow moved to New York City before 1910.

She explained in a 1916 interview that "a simple pretty melody wedded to a clean little love story always made a good impression on young women, so I decided to confine myself mostly to this type of song, and the size of my royalty checks, and the following I have won, have proved that my judgment was correct."

== Songs and compositions ==
"Dance of the Collywobbles", by Anita Owen (1899)

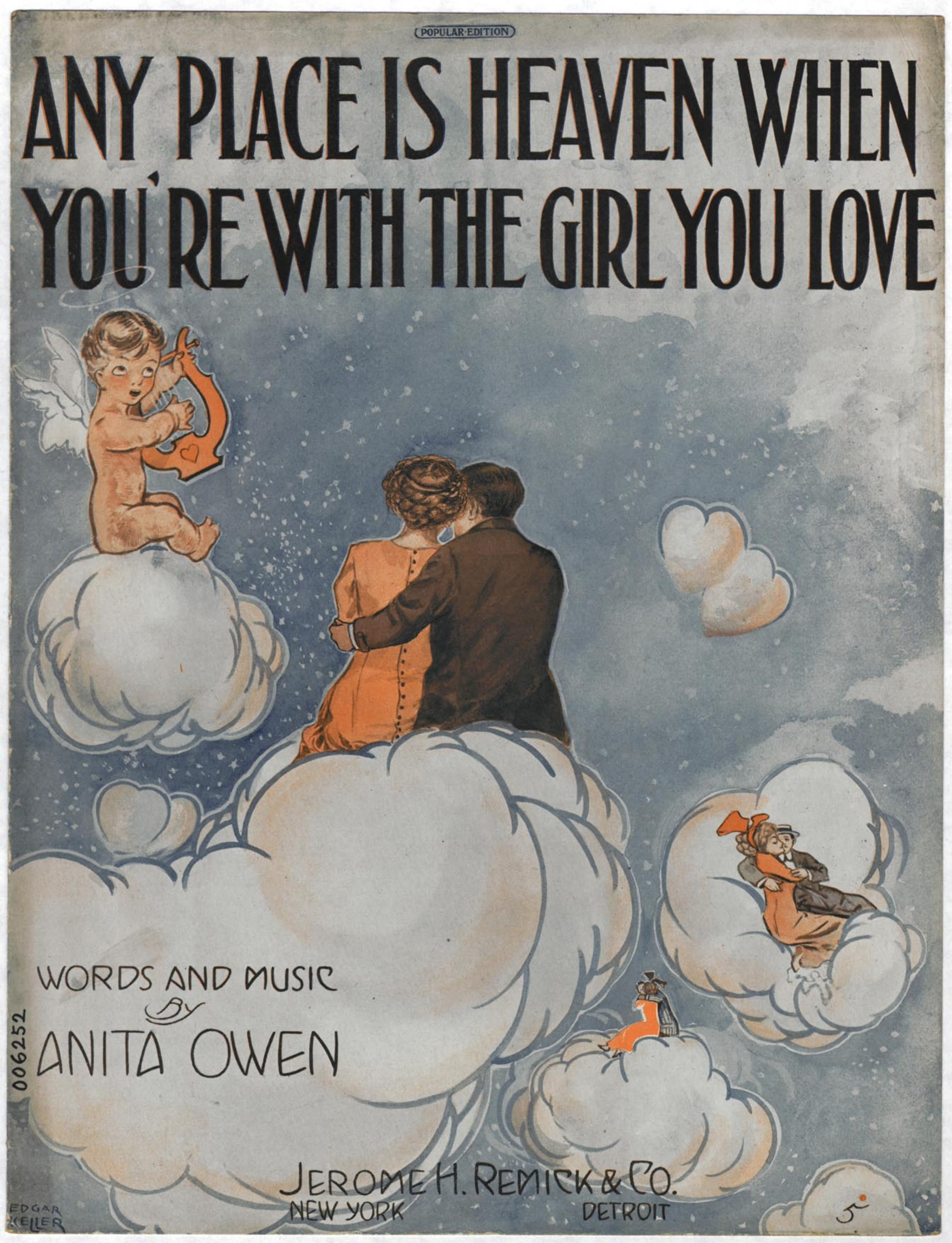
Any place is heaven when you're with the girl you love" (1905) by Anita Owen, cover illustration by Edgar Keller

Owen wrote lyrics and music for over 200 songs. She also wrote instrumental pieces, and a comic opera, The Great Mogul (1903).

- "Sweet Bunch of Daisies" (1894)
- "Only a Rosebud" (1896)
- "Only One Daisy Left" (1898)
- "Dance of the Collywobbles" (1899, instrumental)
- "Sweet Sallie O'Malley" (1902)
- "Ellen O'Hagan" (1904)
- "Any Place is Heaven When You're With the Girl You Love" (1905)
- "Daisies Won't Tell" (1908)
- "When the Daisies Bloom" (1909)
- "Sweet Red Roses" (1910)
- "When the Dew is on the Rose" (1911)
- "Only a Bunch of Violets" (1912)
- "I Want Just You: Waltz Ballad" (1913)
- "Daisies Will Tell You So" (1913)
- "Dreamy Eyes" (1915)
- "I Cannot Bear to Say Goodbye" (1918)
- "Land of Dreams" (1919)
- "Mary You Must Marry Me" (1919)
- "Wander With Me to Love Land" (1919)
- "My Memory of You: Ballad" (1920)
- "If Daisies Could Tell What they Know" (1920)

== Personal life and legacy ==
Owen was named in a divorce case in 1901, involving Lincoln J. Bartlett of Chicago; his wife claimed Bartlett was living with Owen instead of supporting her and their children. Owen married dentist Arthur J. Jones in 1917. The couple lived in Bridgeport and New Haven, Connecticut, in the 1920s. She died in 1932, at the age of 58, in New Haven.

The sheet music for Owen's songs is in several archival collections, and much of it has been digitized, including the illustrations by Frederick S. Manning, William Austin Starmer, and William Haskell Coffin. Nora Louise Hulse, a scholar who specialized in female ragtime composers, included a work by Owen in her collection Cake Walks, Two Steps, and Rags by Women Composers (2001).
