= List of British films of 1987 =

A list of films produced in the United Kingdom in 1987 (see 1987 in film):

== 1987 ==
Title	Director	Cast	Genre	Notes
1987
84 Charing Cross Road	David Jones	Anne Bancroft, Anthony Hopkins	Drama	Entered into the 15th Moscow International Film Festival
Aria	Nicolas Roeg, Charles Sturridge plus eight more	Buck Henry, Beverly D'Angelo	Music/anthology	Ten arias with visual accompaniment; entered into the 1987 Cannes Film Festival
Bellman and True	Richard Loncraine	Bernard Hill, Kieran O'Brien	Crime	
The Belly of an Architect	Peter Greenaway	Brian Dennehy, Chloe Webb	Drama	Entered into the 1987 Cannes Film Festival
Born of Fire	Jamil Dehlavi	Peter Firth, Suzan Crowley	Sci-fi	
Business as Usual	Lezli-An Barrett	Glenda Jackson, John Thaw	Drama	
Casanova	Simon Langton	Richard Chamberlain, Faye Dunaway	Adventure	Made for TV
Coast to Coast	Sandy Johnson	Lenny Henry, John Shea	Comedy	
Cry Freedom	Richard Attenborough	Kevin Kline, Penelope Wilton, Denzel Washington, John Thaw	Biopic	
The Dead	John Huston	Anjelica Huston, Donal McCann	Literary drama	John Huston's last film
Eat the Rich	Peter Richardson	Nosher Powell, Al Pillay, Nigel Planer, Miranda Richardson	Comedy	
The Fourth Protocol	John Mackenzie	Michael Caine, Pierce Brosnan	Thriller	
Full Metal Jacket	Stanley Kubrick	Matthew Modine, Adam Baldwin, Vincent D'Onofrio, Lee Ermey, Dorian Harewood, Arliss Howard, Kevyn Major Howard, Ed O'Ross	War drama	
Grand Larceny	Jeannot Szwarc	Marilu Henner, Ian McShane	Thriller	
Hellraiser	Clive Barker	Ashley Laurence, Doug Bradley	Horror	
Hidden City	Stephen Poliakoff	Charles Dance, Richard E. Grant, Bill Paterson	Drama	
High Season	Clare Peploe	Jacqueline Bisset, James Fox	Romance/comedy	
Hope and Glory	John Boorman	Sebastian Rice-Edwards, Sarah Miles	World War II drama	
The Hunting of the Snark	Mike Batt	Billy Connolly, Roger Daltrey	Musical	Based on a poem by Lewis Carroll
Jane and the Lost City	Terry Marcel	Kirsten Hughes, Maud Adams	Comedy	
The Last Emperor	Bernardo Bertolucci	John Lone, Joan Chen, Peter O'Toole	Biopic	Co-production with China, France and Italy; Won nine Academy Awards, including Best Picture
The Last of England	Derek Jarman	Tilda Swinton, Nigel Terry	Drama	
The Living Daylights	John Glen	Timothy Dalton, Maryam d'Abo, Joe Don Baker, Jeroen Krabbé	Spy/action	
The Lonely Passion of Judith Hearne	Jack Clayton	Maggie Smith, Bob Hoskins	Drama	
Maschenka	John Goldschmidt	Cary Elwes, Irina Brook	Drama	
Maurice	James Ivory	James Wilby, Hugh Grant, Rupert Graves	Literary drama	Based on the novel by E. M. Forster
A Month in the Country	Pat O'Connor	Colin Firth, Kenneth Branagh	Literary drama	Screened at the 1987 Cannes Film Festival
On the Black Hill	Andrew Grice	Nicola Beddoe, Patrick Godfrey, Mike Gwilym	Drama	
Out of Order	Jonnie Turpie	Gary Webster, Natasha Williams	Comedy	
Partition	Ken McMullen	Saeed Jaffrey, Zia Mohyeddin	Drama	
Personal Services	Terry Jones	Julie Walters, Shirley Stelfox, Alec McCowen	Comedy	Inspired by the real experiences of Cynthia Payne
Playing Away	Horace Ové	Norman Beaton, Robert Urquhart	Comedy	
A Prayer for the Dying	Mike Hodges	Mickey Rourke, Liam Neeson, Bob Hoskins	Drama	
Prick Up Your Ears	Stephen Frears	Gary Oldman, Alfred Molina, Vanessa Redgrave	Biopic	Entered into the 1987 Cannes Film Festival
Sammy and Rosie Get Laid	Stephen Frears	Shashi Kapoor, Frances Barber	Drama	
The Second Victory	Gerald Thomas	Anthony Andrews, Helmut Griem, Max von Sydow	Drama	
Straight to Hell	Alex Cox	Sy Richardson, Courtney Love, Joe Strummer	Action comedy	Co-production with the US and Spain
Superman IV: The Quest for Peace	Sidney Furie	Christopher Reeve, Gene Hackman	Adventure	Co-production with the US
Waiting for the Moon	Jill Godmilow	Linda Bassett, Jacques Boudet, Linda Hunt	Drama	
White Mischief	Michael Radford	Greta Scacchi, Charles Dance, Joss Ackland	Drama	
White Of The Eye	Donald Cammell	David Keith, Cathy Moriarty	Thriller	
Wish You Were Here	David Leland	Emily Lloyd, Tom Bell	Comedy/drama	
Withnail and I	Bruce Robinson	Paul McGann, Richard E. Grant, Richard Griffiths	Comedy	

== See also ==
- 1987 in British music
- 1987 in British radio
- 1987 in British television
- 1987 in the United Kingdom
