= 1906 in radio =

The year 1906 in radio involved some significant events.

== Events ==
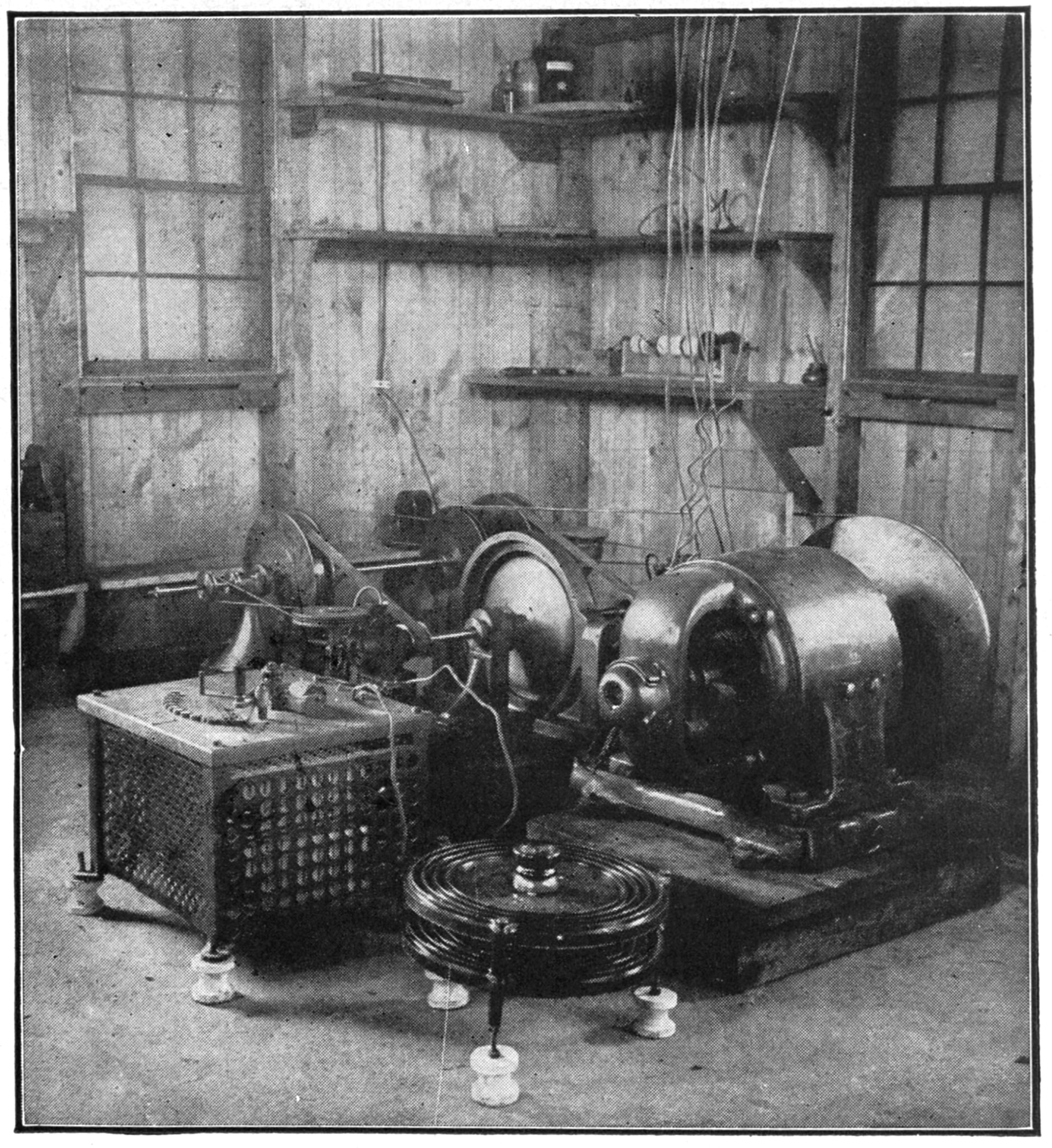
Alternator transmitter, used by Reginald Fessenden for audio transmissions

- 3 October – The first International Radiotelegraph Convention opens in Berlin.
- 24 December – Reginald Fessenden makes the first radio broadcast from Brant Rock, Massachusetts, USA: a bible reading, a violin solo and a speech.
- Lee de Forest invents the audion (triode).

== Births ==
- 14 January – William Bendix, American film, radio and television actor (died 1964)
- 19 January – Lanny Ross, American singer, pianist and songwriter (died 1988)
- 8 February – Harman Grisewood, English radio actor and administrator (died 1997)
- 20 February – James Jewell, American radio actor, producer and director (died 1975)
- 24 April – William Joyce, American-born Nazi propagandist (executed 1946)
- 13 May – Eileen Fowler, English fitness instructor (died 2000)
