= Resurrection (opera) =

Opera by Peter Maxwell Davies

- Opera by Peter Maxwell Davies
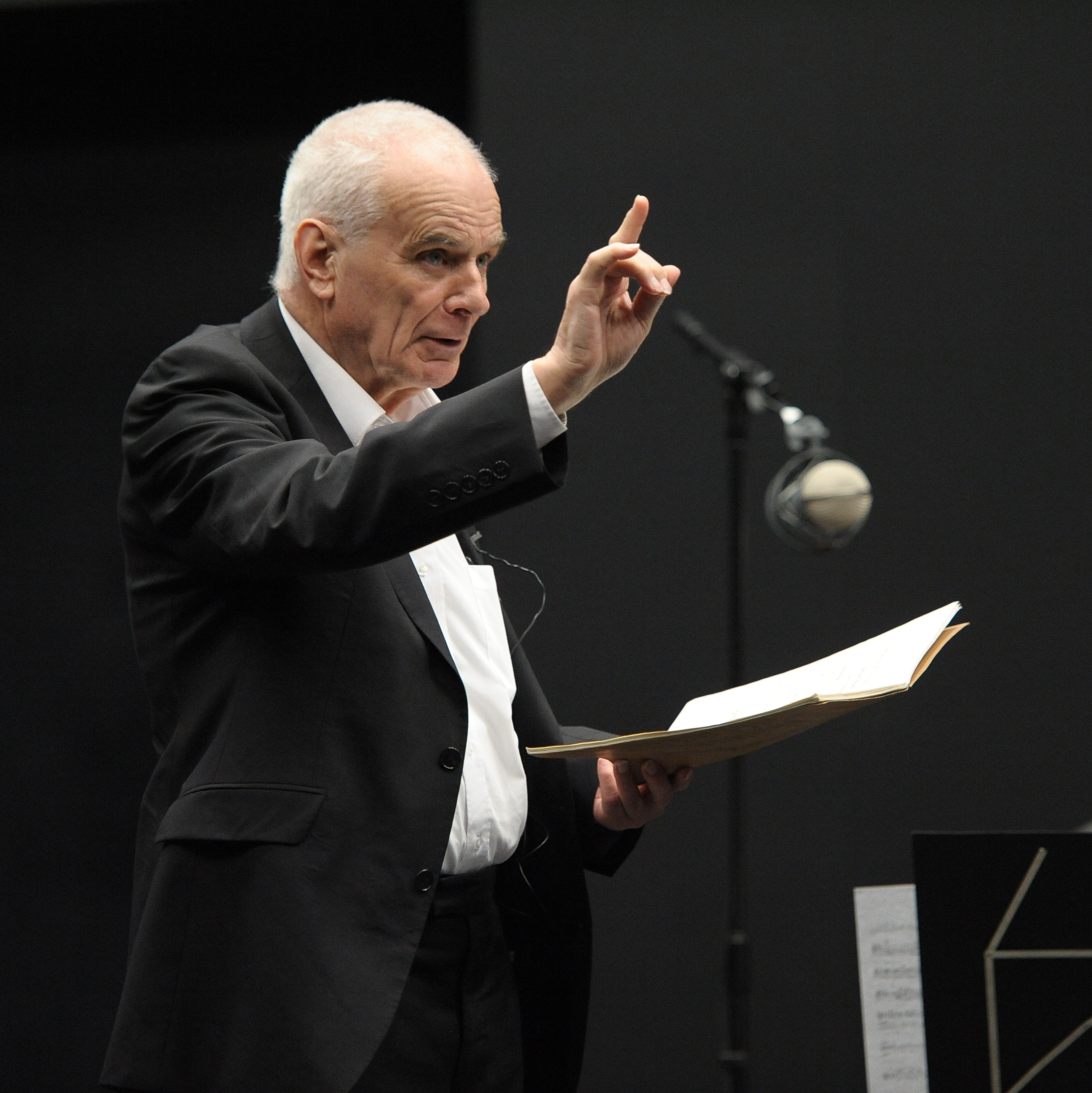
- The composer in 2012
- Premiere: 18 September 1987; Staatstheater Darmstadt

Resurrection is an opera by the English composer Peter Maxwell Davies. Davies conceived it in 1963 whilst at Princeton University. However, the composer did not complete the opera until over 20 years later. The work received its premiere on 18 September 1987 at the Staatstheater Darmstadt, Germany.

Besides the protagonist, represented by a dummy, there are 23 roles requiring seven singers (mezzo-soprano, countertenor, bass, two tenors, two baritones) and four dancers. The orchestra contains single winds including trumpet and horn, and strings, as well as a backstage brass band. Davies also incorporates a rock band in the instrumentation, in his use of various musical styles.

John Warnaby has discussed the relation of the opera to the writings of James Joyce and Thomas Mann.

== Synopsis ==
The opera is in a prologue and one act.

The story concerns a mute child who never speaks or sings during the work and how his family deals with him and tries to mould him. In the Prologue, his parents and other authority figures hector him, as well as numerous television advertisements. By the end of the Prologue, the mute child's head has exploded.

In the main act, several surgeons endeavour to reconstruct the child. In so doing, the child is urged to adopt conformist social and religious attitudes. One surgeon dissects the child's brain, and hopes to fix his moral and intellectual faults. Another surgeon works on the dummy's heart, and thus affects the emotional and religious centres. Another surgeon deals with the child's "sexual proclivities" via surgery on the genitals. Eventually, the Antichrist appears, with the dummy child "resurrected", who then turns on the surgeons as the phallus metamorphoses into a machine gun, which is directed at the audience as well as the surgeons.

== Recording ==
- Peter Maxwell Davies: Resurrection (Della Jones, Christopher Robson, Martyn Hill, Neil Jenkins, Henry Herford, Gerald Finley, Jonathon Best, Mary Carewe (solo singers); Blaze (rock band); BBC Philharmonic Orchestra; Peter Maxwell Davies, conductor). CD 1995. Label: Collins Classics 70342
