= Rajni Kaul =

Indian-born British broadcaster and radio presenter (1929–2021)

- Born: Rajni Kapur; 15 July 1929; Peshawar, British India
- Died: 31 August 2021 (aged 92); Faridabad, Haryana, India
- Occupations: Broadcaster and librarian

Rajni Kaul (née Kapur; 15 July 1929 – 31 August 2021) was an Indian-born British broadcaster and radio presenter. She was the first woman to join the BBC Hindi Service as a staffer and became the first woman to read a news bulletin in Hindi on the network in 1961.

== Early life ==
Rajni Kapur was born on 15 July 1929, in Peshawar, one of five children born to Indernath and Sampiyari Kapur. Following the Partition of India in 1947, the family moved to Delhi.

== Career ==
At the age of 17, Kapur was recruited by All India Radio (AIR) to sing songs in Punjabi and Pashto for a children's programme and read the news in Hindi.

Whilst working at AIR, she met Mahendra Kaul, a newsreader in Kashmiri and Urdu and a drama producer. The couple married in 1955.

They moved to America where they both worked for the Voice of America in Washington, and Rajni Kaul qualified as a librarian. She had a love of books and considered she had arrived in “heaven” when first ushered into a library.

The family moved to London in 1961 and both Rajni and Mahendra Kaul took up work for the BBC Hindi. They made London their home.

Kaul worked as a children's librarian as well as presenting a children's programme on BBC Hindi, Indradhanush (Rainbow) which was very popular in India. She became known as “Rajni didi” to a generation of children. She insisted on personally answering the 'sackfuls of fan mail' she received. She also presented a women's programme on the station and was known as ‘smile of the Hindi service’.

She was involved when in 1966 her husband Mahendra launched the Gaylord restaurant in Mortimer Street near Broadcasting House in London, saying “He understands masala”.

== Personal life ==
Rajni Kaul married broadcaster Mahendra Kaul on 2 May 1955. Their daughter Kalyani Kaul was born in December 1960 and went on to become a barrister, QC and circuit judge.

She and her husband were often invited to high profile events, meeting Queen Elizabeth II and often going to Number 10 Downing Street during the Thatcher era. Rajni was very tolerant and amused by Mahendra's flirting with the Prime Minister, Margaret Thatcher.

Throughout her life, Kaul followed a mantra of “A book a day” although she was not a fan of romantic fiction. In an interview with Pervaiz Alam, a former BBC colleague, she said she wanted to take three books with her on her final journey "something by Toni Morrison (“I am willing to touch her feet”), a translation from Japanese literature and Michelle Obama’s Becoming". She read when travelling by bus at Bush House in Aldwych, headquarters of the BBC World Service, and was known to keep reading when walking. She would admonish "tall Englishman she bumped into" to “Look up.”

Kaul died peacefully in her sleep on Tuesday 31 August 2021, aged 92, at the Golden Estate in Faridabad near Delhi. Her death notice in The Times included the memorable line "Her unrivalled ability to interfere, manipulate and micromanage crossed continents and time zones...We love you always". She was cremated and asked for her ashes to be scattered in Rishikesh.
