= Wimpole Village =

- Created by: Peter Kingston
- Voices of: Tim "Timbo" Lloyd
- Opening theme: Tony Kinsey
- Country of origin: United Kingdom
- Original language: English
- No. of episodes: 16

Production
- Producer: Ross Cameron
- Running time: 5 minutes
- Production company: CITV

Original release
- Network: ITV
- Release: 11 September – 4 December 1987

Wimpole Village is a pre-school series which aired on Children's ITV. The stories began as their own children's comic and the animations first aired on TV-am's Are You Awake Yet children's programme in 1985.

It ran for 16 episodes in 1987. The series is named after the creator's house, "Wimpole House".

The rights to Wimpole Village were acquired by Cameron Thomson Entertainment licensed the series to terrestrial television and cable operators in North America and Europe. There has been talk of a rebooted series or possible reruns.

== Content ==
The series focused around the inhabitants of a little village called Wimpole. All characters have names according to their profession.

== Characters ==
- Mayor Charlie Chambers - The mayor of Wimpole Village.
- PC Crooknabber - The policeman.
- Old Bill - PC Crooknabber's police dog.
- Dennis Letterleaver - The postman.
- Stamp - Dennis' post dog.
- Ethel Doughkneader - The baker.
- Ted Dripping - The butcher.
- Captain Mainmast - The sea captain.
- Harold Wholesome - The health food storekeeper.
- Percy Pennywise - The general store keeper.
- Hilda Halfpint - The milklady.
- Ernie Porterline - The stationmaster.
- Smokestack - Ernie's cat
- Horace Hayseeder - The farm worker.
- Father Away - The vicar.
- Major Stickwielder - The retired militaryman.
- The Breadsnapper Twins - Kyle and Nyle are the two twin boys.

== Episodes ==
No.	Title	Original release date
1	"Haybarn on Fire"	11 September 1987
2	"Lighthouse"	13 September 1987
3	"The Police Dog"	18 September 1987
4	"Film Show"	20 September 1987
5	"Station"	25 September 1987
6	"Fairground"	27 September 1987
7	"Nigel Notetaker"	2 October 1987
8	"Sea Rescue"	9 October 1987
9	"The Nasty Gale"	16 October 1987
10	"Snowed Up Village"	23 October 1987
11	"A Visitor from Australia"	30 October 1987
12	"A Lost Dog"	6 November 1987
13	"A Trip to the Zoo"	13 November 1987
14	"Adventure Camp"	20 November 1987
15	"Ghosts in the Village"	27 November 1987
16	"The Bad Stranger"	4 December 1987

== Books ==
Several books were also created by Studio Publications, once again with pictures by Peter Kingston.

== Videos ==
Over the course of 1989, Tempo and MSD Video released two video releases of the show.

Title	Release date	Episodes
Wimpole Village (V9180)	3 April 1989	Haybarn on Fire, Lighthouse, The Police Dog, Film Show, Station, Fairground, Nigel Notetaker, Sea Rescue
Wimpole Village 2 (92672)	6 November 1989	The Nasty Gale, Snowed Up Village, A Visitor from Australia, A Lost Dog, A Trip to the Zoo, Adventure Camp, Ghosts in the Village, The Bad Stranger.

On 4 March 1991, Tempo Pre-School (distributed by Abbey Home Entertainment) re-released the first Wimpole Village video with the same 8 episodes from it and a door plaque came free with the video inside its box.

Title	Release date	Episodes
Wimpole Village (91802)	4 March 1991	Haybarn on Fire, Lighthouse, The Police Dog, Film Show, Station, Fairground, Nigel Notetaker, Sea Rescue

Children's Compilations

In November 1989, Tempo Video (distributed by Wm. Collins) released a compilation video with a double bill of Wimpole Village containing "Nigel Notetaker" and "The Sea Rescue" together along with a double bill of Broomstick Cottage and a single episode each from Huxley Pig and The Herbs.

Title	Release date	Episodes
Children's Video Favourites (92482)	6 November 1989	Nigel Notetaker; The Sea Rescue

Between 1991 and 1994, episodes of Wimpole Village have been released on children's compilation videos released by Abbey Home Entertainment Distribution.

Title	Release date	Episodes
Pre-School Favourites	18 February 1991	A Trip to the Zoo

In October 1991, the "Haybarn Fire" episode of Wimpole Village was released on a single pre-school compilation which was exclusively sold and distributed under license from Abbey Home Entertainment by Entertainment UK Ltd (in its "Starvision" and "Funhouse" range of children's videos) along with Huxley Pig, Broomstick Cottage and Will Quack Quack.

Title	Release date	Episodes
Pre-School Choice (EUKV 2014)	7 October 1991	The Haybarn Fire

Title	Release date	Episodes
The Avon Pre-School Collection	1993	Adventure Camp

Title	Release date	Episodes
The Biggest Ever Pre-School Video	7 June 1993	The Nasty Gale; Adventure Camp
The Biggest Ever Pre-School Video 2	11 July 1994	Lighthouse; Fairground

As of 2022, there have been no DVD releases of the series.
