= Manohar Kaul =

Indian painter and art historian

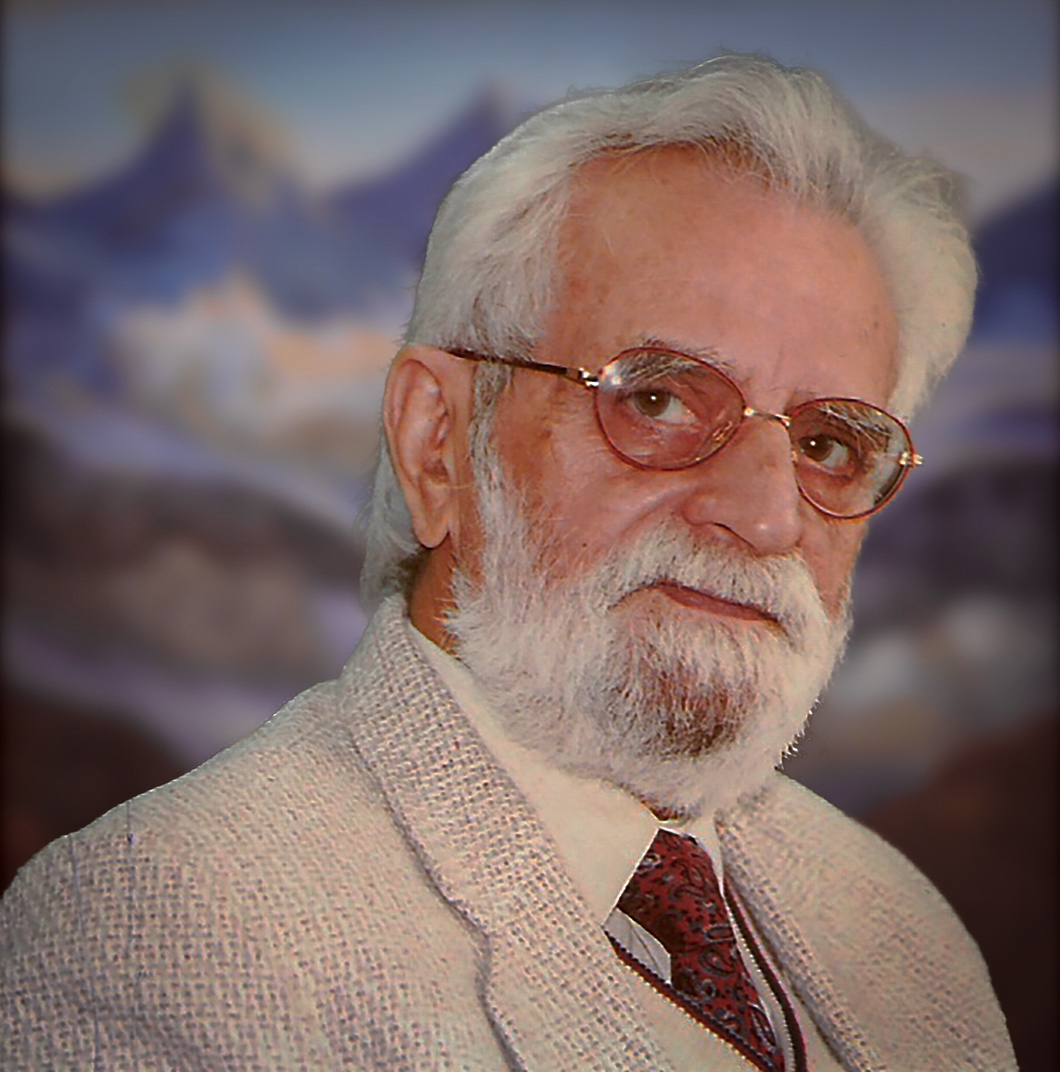
- Born: Manohar Nath Kaul; 21 September 1925; Srinagar, Kashmir, India
- Died: 15 December 1999 (aged 74); Delhi, India
- Education: MA Economics
- Known for: painting, Indian visual culture, art historical writing
- Notable work: Mystique of the Moon, Auras of the Dawn, Trends in Indian Painting
- Style: Landscapes: Water colours, Oil and Acrylic colours on Canvas
- Spouse: Mohini Kaul
- Children: 6
- Awards: Jammu and Kashmir Cultural Akademi Award (1965); Kala Vibhushan, AIFACS (1988)
- Website: https://manoharkaul.in/

Manohar Kaul (1925–1999) was an Indian painter and art historian known for his evocative Himalayan landscapes and writings on Indian aesthetics. Born in Srinagar, Kashmir, he played a prominent role in post-independence Indian art. His paintings are held in major collections, including the National Gallery of Modern Art, Lalit Kala Akademi, the All India Fine Arts and Crafts Society (AIFACS), and various private collections.

== Early life and education ==
Born Manohar Nath Kaul on 21 September 1925 in Srinagar, India into a Kashmiri Pandit family. He later adopted Manohar Kaul as his artistic and literary identity, the name under which all his major works were published and exhibited. His father, Prof. Kanth Kaul, a deeply learned and spiritual figure. Among the first in Jammu & Kashmir to earn a Master’s degree—likely around 1918 from Calcutta University—Prof. Kaul taught English literature at S.P. College, Srinagar, where he also served as librarian, curating the institution’s collection of books and manuscripts. He later held a librarian position at the Hindustan Times in Delhi. His immersion in literature and philosophy significantly influenced Manohar Kaul’s intellectual and artistic development. Kaul's early education began at Gurukul school in Gujranwala, in the Punjab region of British India (now in Pakistan). The institution was rooted in traditional Indian education and instilled in him a deep appreciation for Vedic learning and traditional Indian education. This environment instilled in him a lifelong appreciation for Indian philosophy, aesthetics, and inner discipline. He pursued formal art training at the Sir Amar Singh Technical Institute in Srinagar, where he studied painting and drawing. He further distinguished himself by achieving a First Class in the City & Guilds Institute (London University) examination in Painting, a notable accomplishment for an Indian artist at the time.

== Post-Partition and early career ==
The tribal invasion of Kashmir in 1947–48 forced Kaul to leave his homeland and rebuild his life in Delhi. Though he came from a well-to-do family and held a Master's degree in Economics, the upheaval left him with little. A passionate painter since childhood, he took up small jobs and quietly offered his early watercolours for sale—often on the roadside or wherever he could find a willing viewer. This period of hardship shaped his resilience and reaffirmed his lifelong commitment to art.

== Artistic style and career ==
Manohar Kaul’s watercolours are distinguished by their meditative stillness and deep spiritual undertones, grounded in Kashmir’s natural beauty and cultural memory. His colour palette—which he believed had emotional and healing qualities—is particularly evident in series like Mystique of the Moon and Auras of the Dawn. He painted in solitude, often during the early morning, regarding his work as a personal meditation. Contemporary critic Ratnottama Sen Gupta noted that his art “brings alive dead pretty Kashmir,” highlighting how he captured the landscape’s soulful presence rather than its political turmoil.

== Editorial and institutional work ==
In addition to his work as a painter, Manohar Kaul held several editorial and institutional positions that contributed to the post-independence art landscape in India. He served as Assistant Editor of Roopa-Lekha, the journal published by the All India Fine Arts & Crafts Society (AIFACS), a role he held until 1990. He also edited Art News, another AIFACS publication.

Kaul went on to become the founder-editor of Kala Darshan, a magazine independently produced to promote Indian arts and culture. In 1993, he was invited to serve as Guest Editor for LKA Contemporary, published by the Lalit Kala Akademi, where he curated a special issue on “The Bengal School: Its Impact on Contemporary Artistic Concerns.”

He was also a regular contributor to Indian newspapers and journals from the 1950s onward, offering critical insight on Indian and international art with a distinctly rooted and reflective voice.

== Exhibitions and recognition ==
Manohar Kaul exhibited widely over the course of his career, with his work featured in both solo and group exhibitions in India and abroad. A major retrospective was held in 1983, showcasing over three decades of his paintings, and was noted for capturing the evolving spiritual and aesthetic themes in his work. In later years, he exhibited a series of watercolours informed by his exploration of color therapy, which reflected his belief in the emotional and curative power of color.

His paintings are held in several important public and private collections, including the National Gallery of Modern Art (New Delhi), Lalit Kala Akademi, All India Fine Arts & Crafts Society (AIFACS), Punjab Museum and Art Gallery and the Ministry of External Affairs.

=== Solo Exhibitions ===
Manohar Kaul held numerous solo exhibitions throughout his career, showcasing the evolution of his artistic vision:

- The First: Water Colours (1957)
- Retrospective (1983)
- At Shridharani (1984)
- Glory of Himalayas (1985)
- Back to Water Colours (1991)
- Mystic of the Moon (1992)
- Auras of Dawn (1994)
- Healing Colours (1998)
- A Homage (2000)

Kaul’s contributions to Indian art were recognized with a number of honors. He received the Jammu and Kashmir Cultural Akademi Award in 1965, and the title of Kala Vibhushan from AIFACS in 1988. He was also invited as a visiting lecturer at institutions such as Bhartiya Vidya Bhavan and the College of Art, Delhi, where he shared his deep understanding of Indian aesthetics and art.

== Writings and publications ==
- Trends in Indian Painting: Ancient, Medieval, Modern (1961), published by Dhoomimal Ramchand. With a foreword by Dr. S. Radhakrishnan.
- Trends in Indian Painting: Ancient, Medieval, Modern is a survey of Indian painting by Manohar Kaul, tracing its development across classical, court, religious, and folk traditions. The book explores the stylistic and philosophical foundations of Indian aesthetics, from the murals of Ajanta to miniature schools such as Mughal, Pahari, and Rajasthani, as well as early modern movements of the 20th century. Richly illustrated with 134 tipped-in plates in both colour and black & white, the volume was published by Dhoomimal Ramchand with a foreword by Dr. S. Radhakrishnan. It has been referenced as a comprehensive introduction for students, historians, and art enthusiasts interested in Indian visual culture
- Kashmir: Hindu, Buddhist and Muslim Architecture (1971), published by Sagar Publications. With a foreword by Dr. Karan Singh.
- Kashmir – Hindu, Buddhist and Muslim Architecture is a monograph by Manohar Kaul that surveys the architectural heritage of the Kashmir Valley across religious traditions. As the first volume in the Indian Culture Series, the book introduces temples, stupas, and mosques with an emphasis on their historical and artistic significance. It draws from diverse architectural styles to present Kashmir’s monuments as part of a broader cultural continuum. The volume includes photographs provided by the Archaeological Survey of India and the Ministry of Information and Broadcasting. Written in an accessible style, it serves as both a visual record and an introductory guide for readers interested in the region’s religious and architectural history.
- Visions and Voices (1992), published by Kala Darshan Publication, Delhi.
- Visions and Voices is a collaborative tabletop book by artist Manohar Kaul and poet Keshav Malik, published by Kala Darshan Publication, Delhi. The volume presents a series of paintings inspired by the moon as a symbolic and emotional muse, paired with poems that explore themes of beauty, transience, and artistic reflection. Through this interplay of visual art and poetry, the book reflects on inner experience and the natural world, offering a contemplative meditation on creativity. Visions and Voices stands as a unique dialogue between image and word, uniting two artistic sensibilities in a shared expression of inspiration.

== Philosophy and legacy ==
Manohar Kaul viewed painting as a deeply personal and meditative practice, rather than a pursuit driven by market or visibility. He was known to paint during amritvela—the quiet predawn hours—which he considered most fertile for creative energy. Kaul’s work often avoided direct depictions of conflict or turmoil, instead offering a serene, spiritual response rooted in the beauty of Kashmir. “I want to show everyone how beautiful Kashmir was,” he once said. “Only then will they get the strength to change it.”

Later in life, Kaul developed a strong interest in color therapy, exploring the emotional and healing impact of specific hues. This intuitive engagement with color, informed by his interest in astrology, often found quiet expression in his later watercolours. He believed that certain colors held vibrational energies aligned with cosmic rhythms and human consciousness. Though he seldom discussed these influences publicly, they shaped his reflections on harmony, emotion, and balance.

Kaul consciously avoided self-promotion, preferring solitude and sincerity in both life and art. He generously mentored younger artists and remained committed to a vision of art as a form of cultural memory and inner discipline. His legacy endures not only through his paintings and writings, but also through the institutions he shaped and the values he upheld in India's post-independence art landscape.
