= Asian Magazine =

- Presented by: Rashid Ashraf
- Country of origin: United Kingdom
- Original languages: Hindi; Urdu

Production
- Running time: 30 minutes

Original release
- Network: BBC One
- Release: 20 June 1982 – 26 April 1987

Asian Magazine is a weekly news magazine aimed at the Asian community. It replaced Nai Zindagi Naya Jeevan which had been on air since 1968. Broadcast on BBC1 on Sunday mornings at 10am, the programme ran for five years from 20 June 1982 until 26 April 1987 and the final edition of the programme marked the end of television programming by the BBC in Hindi and Urdu. Three months later, a new English language magazine programme, Network East, was launched and was broadcast on BBC2 on Saturday afternoons.

Throughout its time on air, a midweek companion programme aimed at Asian women, Gharbar, was also broadcast. Gharbar ended two days after the final episode of Asian Magazine was transmitted.
