= Gharbar =

- Country of origin: United Kingdom

Production
- Running time: 25 minutes

Original release
- Network: BBC One; BBC Two
- Release: 19 October 1977 – 28 April 1987

Gharbar is a weekly BBC television programme for the Asian community, which aired from 1977 to 1987. Initially a twenty-six-part series billed as "helping Asian families to help themselves", the programme was made permanent the following April and was aimed at Asian women. The programme generally consisted of features, a children's story and a musical item.

== Broadcast history ==
The first edition was broadcast on BBC Two on 19 October 1977 at 10:20 am and was presented by Lalita Ahmed, Rajni Kaul and Nahid Niazi. The programme continued in that slot until the transfer of schools programming from BBC1 to BBC2 in September 1983 which saw Gharbar transfer to BBC One. It continued to be broadcast on Wednesday mornings but was shown at the slightly later time of 10:55 am (10:50 am from the following year), after Play School. At the start of September 1986, and ahead of the launch of the new BBC television daytime service, the programme returned to BBC Two. It was moved to Tuesdays and broadcast at the earlier time of 9 am so that it didn't clash with the start of that day's schools programming. It continued in this slot until the last episode was broadcast on 28 April 1987, two days after companion programme Asian Magazine ended, ahead of the start of a new English language programme for the Asian community, Network East, which launched in July 1987.
