= Heart and Soul: The Very Best of T'Pau =

Compilation album by T'Pau
- Released: 15 February 1993
- Genre: Pop; rock
- Label: Virgin
- Producer: Roy Thomas Baker; Andy Richards

T'Pau chronology
The Promise (1991)	Heart and Soul: The Very Best of T'Pau (1993)	The Greatest Hits (1997)

Professional ratings
Review scores
Source	Rating
AllMusic	3/5 stars
Music Week	3/5 stars

Heart and Soul: The Very Best of T'Pau is a compilation album by British pop group T'Pau, which was released by Virgin Records in 1993. It reached number 35 on the UK Albums Chart and remained in the top 100 for two weeks.

The compilation's title was based on the band's successful debut single "Heart and Soul".

== Track listing ==
All tracks are written by Carol Decker and Ronnie Rogers, except "This Girl" written by T'Pau

No.	Title	Length
1.	"Heart and Soul"	4:17
2.	"Valentine"	3:57
3.	"Only a Heartbeat"	4:40
4.	"Whenever You Need Me"	4:05
5.	"Secret Garden"	4:06
6.	"Sex Talk"	4:13
7.	"Road to Our Dream"	4:40
8.	"This Girl"	4:03
9.	"Only the Lonely"	4:24
10.	"Bridge of Spies"	5:23
11.	"I Will Be With You"	4:04
12.	"China in Your Hand"	5:07

== Personnel ==
T'Pau

- Carol Decker – lead vocal
- Dean Howard – lead guitar
- Ronnie Rogers – rhythm guitar
- Michael Chetwood – keyboard
- Paul Jackson – bass guitar
- Tim Burgess – percussion

Additional musicians

- Gary Barnacle – saxophone on "Road to Our Dream", "This Girl" and "China in Your Hand"

Production

- Roy Thomas Baker – producer (tracks 1–2, 5–12)
- Andy Richards – producer (tracks 3–4)
- Stephen W. Tayler – mixing (tracks 5, 7–9)
- Ian Taylor – mixing (track 4)
- Chris Lord-Alge – mixing (track 3)

Sleeve

- Bill Smith Studio – design
- Mike Owen – front cover photography
- Tony McGee – inner photography

== Charts ==
Chart (1993)	Peak position
UK Albums Chart	35
