= Rage (T'Pau album) =

Studio album by T'Pau
- Released: 24 October 1988
- Recorded: 1988
- Genre: Pop
- Label: Virgin
- Producer: Roy Thomas Baker (one track produced by: Tim Burgess; Carol Decker; Ron Rogers)

T'Pau chronology
Bridge of Spies (1987)	Rage (1988)	The Promise (1991)

Singles from Rage
- 1. "Secret Garden" Released: 19 September 1988; 2. "Road to Our Dream" Released: 7 November 1988; 3. "Only the Lonely" Released: 13 March 1989

Rage is the second album by English pop group T'Pau, released in 1988. It reached number 4 on the UK Albums Chart and gave the group three hit singles—"Secret Garden" (a UK Top 20), "Road to Our Dream" and "Only the Lonely". It was not issued in the U.S.

== Overview ==
The album was recorded during the summer of 1988, one year after T'Pau released their debut album Bridge of Spies and following extensive touring and live performances, including supporting Nik Kershaw on his Radio Musicola UK tour in early 1987, USA in summer 1987; support to Bryan Adams on his Into the Fire European tour in Autumn 1987; T'pau's own UK "China Tour", named after their single "China in Your Hand"; and "The 1/5 Tour", the band's first headline tour across Europe, but their fifth in total - hence the play on words in the tour's title.

The bulk of recording was completed at Wisseloord Studios in the Netherlands, again with Roy Thomas Baker in the producer's chair. Additional recording was completed at a number of other studios including Wessex, Farmyard and Olympic Studios. The original version of the album was mixed at Olympic, with the exception of the track "Between the Lines". This was not originally planned to be on the album and was written after much of the album had been recorded. However, the band liked it so much that it moved from being a future B-side (as was originally planned) to the final album line-up.

The song "This Girl" was only on the UK CD version, but was also released as the B-side of the "Secret Garden" single, and on the albums Heart and Soul – The Very Best of T'Pau and The Greatest Hits.

== Artwork ==
The artwork for the release includes the word "rage" rearranged to form a face (similar to the Moai stone heads found on Easter Island). This was similar to the rearranging of the word "T'pau" on the band's debut album Bridge of Spies and their third album The Promise. The cover also features a photograph of the whole band in front of an upturned steam engine art installation in Berlin. Other photographs of the band taken in Berlin feature on the covers of the singles from this album: "Secret Garden" shows part of the Berlin Wall and "Road to Our Dream" features the Berlin Olympic Stadium.

== Canadian version ==
Although the final album was accepted by T'Pau's record company and released in October 1988, it was felt that a "harder" sounding or more guitar-based album would be better for the North American market. As a result, in early 1989 (and following the "Rage Across Europe" tour) the band went back into the studio to produce a new version of Rage. However, despite the extra work the album was, ultimately, not released in the US and therefore has become known as the "Canadian" version.

The Canadian release came out almost a year later than the UK version with four songs noticeably remixed: "Arms of Love", "Only the Lonely", "Running Away", and "Island". "This Girl" was omitted. The most different sounding track is "Island" which almost sounds like a different song - mainly due to the fact that it was entirely re-recorded with a different producer (Gary Langan & T'Pau) at The Manor Studio. The artwork is also totally different on the Canadian album with a solo photograph of lead singer Carol Decker and block lettering on the front.

The song "Only the Lonely" on the UK album has the lyrics "and here we go spending our money, Filling the house with things we hope will bring us happiness again" at the end of the first verse, but they have been omitted from the remixed version on the Canadian album. This remixed and slightly shorter version of the song was also used for its UK and Canadian single releases (listed as "The Guitar Remix" on the single's cover and accompanied by a rockier, extended "Nightmare Mix" on the 12" and CD singles, and was presumably prepared as a radio edit to take listeners more quickly to the chorus.

== Critical reception ==
Professional ratings
Review scores
Source	Rating
AllMusic	3/5 stars
New Musical Express	7/10 stars
Number One	4/5 stars
Number One	3/5 stars

In positive review of 12 August 1989 Rob Garner of RPM pointed that "remarkably bland input of the band does nothing more than provide a background for Carol Decker's elastic vocals. She once again impresses with her energetic and very personal style." Taking in consideration that Decker "penned all but one track" Garner concluded that the album could be considered as her solo work. The reviewer summarized: "A more spectacular support team could have made her a spectacular album. As it stands Decker is trapped inside this 'good' record."

== Track listing ==
All tracks are written by Carol Decker and Ron Rogers, except where noted.

Side A
No.	Title	Writer(s)	Length
1.	"Arms of Love"		3:34
2.	"Only the Lonely"		4:23
3.	"Running Away"		3:22
4.	"Between the Lines"	Decker; Rogers; Michael Chetwood; Paul Jackson; Tim Burgess; Dean Howard	3:30
5.	"Road to Our Dream"		4:40

Side B
No.	Title	Length
1.	"Island"	5:16
2.	"Heaven"	3:30
3.	"Taking Time Out"	3:30
4.	"Secret Garden"	4:06
5.	"Time Will Tell"	3:38

CD exclusive track
No.	Title	Length
11.	"This Girl"	4:02

== Personnel ==
=== Musicians ===
- Carol Decker – lead and backing vocals
- Dean Howard – guitars
- Ronnie Rogers – guitars
- Michael Chetwood – keyboards
- Paul Jackson – bass
- Tim Burgess – drums, percussion
- Gary Barnacle – saxophone on "Road to Our Dream" and "This Girl" (uncredited)
- Pete Thoms – trombone on "This Girl" (uncredited)
- Simon Gardner, John Thirkell – trumpet on "This Girl" (uncredited)

=== Technical ===
- Produced by Roy Thomas Baker, Carol Decker, Ronnie Rogers and Tim Burgess
- Engineered by Norman Goodman, Stephen W. Tayler, John Brough and Ben Kape with Lorraine Francis, Stewart Stawman, Derek Murphy and Ronald Prent
- Mixed by Stephen W. Tayler and Roy Thomas Baker
- Mastered by Arun Chakraverty

== Charts ==
=== Weekly charts ===
Weekly chart performance for Rage
Chart (1988)	Peak position
Dutch Albums (Album Top 100)	71
European Albums (Music & Media)	17
German Albums (Offizielle Top 100)	44
Norwegian Albums (VG-lista)	16
Swedish Albums (Sverigetopplistan)	14
Swiss Albums (Schweizer Hitparade)	21
UK Albums (OCC)	4

=== Year-end charts ===
Year-end chart performance for Rage
Chart (1988)	Position
UK Albums (Gallup)	79
