= Pleasure & Pain (T'Pau album) =

2015 studio album by T'Pau

Studio album by T'Pau
- Released: 2 February 2015
- Studio: Up the Lane Recordings, Monmouth
- Genre: Pop; rock
- Label: Gnatfish
- Producer: Ron Rogers; Carsten Moss

T'Pau chronology
Red (1998)	Pleasure & Pain (2015)	Be Wonderful (2026)

Pleasure & Pain is the fifth studio album by English pop/rock band T'Pau, released on 2 February 2015 by Gnatfish Records. It is the band's first album of new material since Red in 1998. The album reached number 98 on the UK Albums Chart. Some tracks were co-composed with original rhythm guitarist Taj Wyzgowski who played on their 1987 debut album Bridge of Spies. This was not issued in the U.S.

== Track listing ==
No.	Title	Writer(s)	Length
1.	"Nowhere"	Ron Rogers, Carol Decker, James Ashby, Carsten Moss
2.	"Demolition Man"	Ron Rogers, Carol Decker, John Henderson, Alan Thompson, Spencer Cozens, Taj Wyzgowski
3.	"Sammy and Dave"	Ron Rogers, Carol Decker
4.	"Last Temptation"	Carol Decker, Feldman
5.	"Misbelieving"	Ron Rogers, Carol Decker, David
6.	"Change Your Mind"	Ron Rogers, Carol Decker, Peter-John Vettese
7.	"Once in a Lifetime"	Ron Rogers, Carol Decker
8.	"I Think About You"	Ron Rogers, Carol Decker, John Henderson, Alan Thompson, Spencer Cozens, Taj Wyzgowski
9.	"Read My Mind"	Carol Decker, Carsten Moss
10.	"House of Love"	Ron Rogers, Carol Decker, Simon Darlow
11.	"One Lesson in Love"	Ron Rogers, Carol Decker, David

== Personnel ==
T'Pau

- Carol Decker – vocals
- Ron Rogers – guitars
- James Ashby – guitars
- Carsten Moss – keyboards
- Kez Gunes – bass
- Dave Hattee – drums

with:

- Odette Adams – backing vocals on "Read My Mind"
- Additional musicians on "I Think About You" – Aaron Amun, Alan Thompson, Spencer Cozens, Taj Waygowski, Dean Howard, Scott Firth, John Henderson (note - spellings as per sleeve notes, songwriting credits have "Thomson" and "Wyzgowski")

Production

- Produced and mixed by Ron Rogers, except "Read My Mind" produced by Carsten Moss and "Change Your Mind" mixed by Jez Ashurst
- Mastered by Pete Maher
- Recorded at Up the Lane Recordings, Monmouth

== Charts ==
Chart performance for Pleasure & Pain
Chart (2015)	Peak position
UK Albums (OCC)	98
UK Independent Albums (OCC)	21
