= With a Little Luck (T'Pau song) =

Single by T'Pau

from the album Red
- B-side: "Now That You're Gone"; "Giving Up the Ghost"
- Released: 1998
- Genre: Pop rock
- Length: 3:40
- Label: Gnatfish Records
- Songwriters: Carol Decker, Ronnie Rogers, J. David
- Producers: Carol Decker, Rafe McKenna, Marco Sabiu

T'Pau singles chronology
"Heart & Soul 97" (1997)	"With a Little Luck" (1998)	"Giving Up the Ghost" (1999)

"With a Little Luck" is a song by British band T'Pau, released as the lead single from their 1998 fourth studio album Red. It was written by vocalist Carol Decker, ex-T'Pau rhythm guitarist Ron Rogers and J. David. It was produced by Decker, Rafe McKenna and Marco Sabiu.

== Background ==
The single was released as the follow-up non-album 1997 single "Heart & Soul '97", which had peaked at #186 in the UK. It was a reworking of the group's 1987 debut single. "With a Little Luck" was the first T'Pau single of original material since 1991's "Only a Heartbeat" from The Promise album. "With a Little Luck" was a promotional single release only, and therefore ineligible to chart.

T'Pau had originally gained success in the late 1980s and split in the early 1990s. In 1997, Decker reformed the band with a completely new line-up and after the release of "Heart & Soul '97", the new line-up started playing gigs and recorded the Red album in 1998. The album and the singles were released on Decker's own Gnatfish label, named after her own nickname.

The Red album was released in September 1998, and the UK Red album tour saw the band play thirty-six shows finishing with a sold out London show at the prestigious Jazz Cafe. The tour was accompanied by the release of the radio promo single, "With a little Luck," and this was followed with a massive amount of radio and press for the single and album release, notably a live session for Virgin Radio and a new live appearance on VH-1. Although co-written by Ron Rogers, who was the band's original rhythm guitarist, he did not play on the Red album or the song.

== Release ==
The single was issued on CD, via Gnatfish Records in the UK only.

The release featured two tracks, both of which came from the Red album as well. These were "Now That You're Gone" and "Giving Up the Ghost", the latter would be re-recorded in 1999 for a commercial single release. Both tracks were written solely by Decker, and produced by both her and McKenna. The single's picture sleeve design used exactly the same artwork as the Red album, and the only difference was the changing of the title.

Following the song's release on the Red album and as a single, a demo version of the song also appeared on the 2007 German Atom Records compilation Sex Talk, which featured two discs; one of previous hits and the other based on demos of the Red album. This demo version also appeared on the similar German compilations T'Pau and Wing and a Prayer.

== Promotion ==
No music video was created to promote the single.

The song has been performed live by the band since its release.

== Track listing ==
CD Single

1. "With a Little Luck" - 4:34
2. "Now That You're Gone" - 4:33
3. "Giving Up the Ghost" - 4:03

== Critical reception ==
Heather Phares of Allmusic reviewed the Red album, and stated "T'Pau returns with Red, its first album since 1991. The group's smooth pop sounds remain intact on songs like "With a Little Luck," "Now That You're Gone," "Giving Up the Ghost," and "Let It All Fall."

In the Classic Rock Magazine of January 1999, Dave Ling reviewed the album, mentioning the song and one of the single's B-Sides, stating "Eight years on, T'Pau has very much become a vehicle for flame-haired siren Carol Decker, who co-wrote all the material, handled the production and now owns the name, all rights reserved. Sonically, T'Pau still favour smooth, occasionally faceless walls of melody best exemplified on "Now That You're Gone" and "Make Love to Me". Could have lived without the Big Country flavoured "Do the Right Dance"; and surely Paul McCartney will be suing Decker for re-writing 'Wings' "With a Little Luck" and re-titling it "Wing and a Prayer"? Nevertheless, this is a solid enough comeback album."

For The War Against Silence, a weekly music-review column, reviewer Glenn McDonald reviewed the Red album and spoke of the song, stating "With a Little Luck" rides on simmering, "Like a Prayer"-ish synthesizers and a chattering drum loop, but by the chorus has abandoned all reticence, and glides into spotlight strut that might make Belinda Carlisle's "Heaven Is a Place on Earth" jealous." Additionally, McDonald spoke of both B-side tracks on the single too, stating "Now That You're Gone", the first of the guitarist Scott Taylor songs, builds from slow drum march and bass rumble into choruses that swirl with guitar buzz and angelic backing-vocal sighs. The haunting reluctant-break-up ballad "Giving Up the Ghost", with a cheesy drum-machine rattle, wispy keyboard fills and some pretty acoustic guitar, could probably be shipped to Celine Dion or Whitney Houston as is, but Decker's raw, unguarded voice keeps it grounded, for me, and it joins the long line of T'Pau love songs whose words don't seem that sophisticated on paper, but swell with genuine emotion when Carol sings them."

== Personnel ==
- Carol Decker – lead vocals
- Jimmy Ashhurst – acoustic guitar, electric guitar
- Spencer Cozens – keyboards
- Dan McKinna – bass guitar
- Dave Hattee – drums

=== Additional personnel ===
- Producer - Carol Decker, Rafe McKenna, Marco Sabiu
- Engineer - Alan Jenkins, Rafe McKenna, Fred DeFaye, Roberto Pieroni
- Assistant Engineer - Simon Morris, Pete Sberi
- Programming - Marco Sabiu
- Mastering - Robin
