= Brian Grant (director) =

British television director and producer

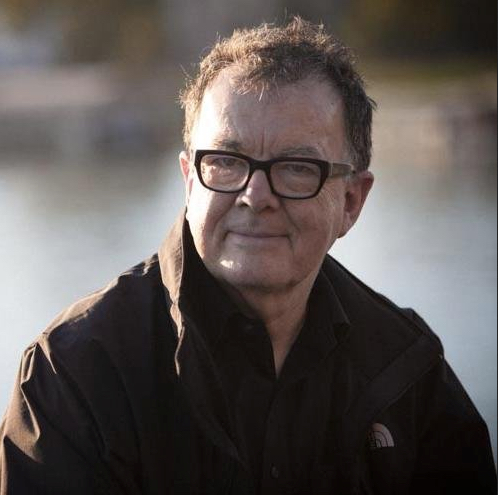
Brian Grant

Brian Grant is a British music video and television director and producer. In 1982 he co-founded MGMM Productions with Scott Millaney, Russell Mulcahy, and David Mallet. The company produced music videos, commercials and films during the 1980's.Grant began his career as a cameraman before moving into directing music videos, commercials and television dramas. His television directing credits include episodes of As If, Hex, Doctor Who, Party Animals, Sinchronicity, Britannia High, Highlander: The Series, Queen of Swords, Clocking Off, New Tricks, Sinbad, The Worst Witch and Our Girl. His other directing credits include Video Killed the Radio Star, Lennon's Last Weekend, No Room For Ravers. He has received nominations for BAFTA and EMMY Awards. During the 1980s Grant directed music videos for artistes including Olivia Newton-John, Donna Summer, Peter Gabriel, Queen, The Human League, Rod Stewart, Tina Turner, Aretha Franklin, Dolly Parton, Kim Wilde, Whitney Houston, Spandau Ballet and Duran Duran.

His video for Olivia Newton-John's "Physical" won the first Video Grammy ever awarded at the 25th Annual Grammy Awards, (Video of the Year). In 1983 Grant directed the music video for Donna Summer's song "She Works Hard for the Money". The video received five MTV Awards, and Donna Summer became the first African-American female artist to get played in high rotation, at the then fledgling MTV network. He also directed her 1983 HBO concert "A Hot Summer's Night..." Grant's video work also included two of singer Whitney Houston's videos, "How Will I Know" (1985) and "I Wanna Dance With Somebody (Who Loves Me)" (1987).

== Filmography ==
- The Tell Tale Heart (1984)
- The Hitchhiker (1986)
- She Wolf of London (1990)
- Sweet Poison (1991)
- Love Kills (1991)
- The Helen Samuels Story (1992)
- Mann & Machine (1992)
- Darkman (1992)
- Complex of Fear (1992)
- Sensation (1993)
- Day of Reckoning (1993)
- The Red Shoe Diaries (1994)
- The Second Noah (1995)
- The Immortals (1995)
- Bloodlines: Legacy of a Lord (1996)
- Bugs (1997)
- Highlander: The Series (1998)
- The Raven (1998)
- Lucy Sullivan Is Getting Married (1999)
- Queen of Swords (1999)
- Cyberstalking (1999)
- As If (2001)
- As If (2002)
- As If USA (2003)
- Clocking Off (2002)
- Hex (2003)
- Hex (2004)
- Gladiatress (2004)
- Doctor Who (2005)
- Love Bytes (2004)
- Hex II (2005)
- Sinchronicity (2005)
- Party Animals (2006)
- Life Is Wild (2006)
- Britannia High (2007)
- Breaker (2008)
- The Allegation (2009)
- Project Lotus (2010)
- Sinbad (2010)
- Video Killed the Radio Star (2011)
- New Tricks (2012)
- Deadinburgh (2013)
- New Tricks (2013)
- Waterloo Road (2014)
- Video Killed the Radio Star (2015)
- The Last Lennon Interview (2016)
- The Worst Witch (2016)
- Our Girl (2018)
- Video Killed the Radio Star (2018)
- Lennon's Last Weekend (2020)
- No Room for Ravers (2021)

== Notable music videos ==
- M – "Pop Muzik" (1979)
- Sparks – "Beat the Clock" (1979)
- Queen – "Play the Game" (1980)
- The Human League – "Open Your Heart" (1981)
- Kim Wilde – "Kids in America" (1981)
- Olivia Newton-John – "Physical" (1981)
- Peter Gabriel – "Shock the Monkey" (1982)
- Haircut 100 – "Nobody's Fool" (1982)
- Queen – "Back Chat" (1982)
- Queen – "Calling All Girls" (1982)
- XTC – "Senses Working Overtime" (1982)
- Talk Talk – "My Foolish Friend" (1983)
- The Fixx – "Saved by Zero" (1983)
- Rod Stewart – "What Am I Gonna Do (I'm So in Love with You)" (1983)
- Bee Gees – "The Woman in You" (1983)
- Donna Summer – "She Works Hard for the Money" (1983)
- Donna Summer – "Unconditional Love" (1983)
- Duran Duran – "New Moon on Monday" (1984)
- Kenny Loggins – "I'm Free (Heaven Helps the Man)" (1984)
- Meat Loaf – "Modern Girl" (1984)
- Aretha Franklin – "Freeway of Love" (1985)
- Whitney Houston – "How Will I Know" (1985)
- Tina Turner – "Private Dancer" (1985)
- The Moody Blues – "Your Wildest Dreams" (1985)
- Gary Moore – "Over the Hills and Far Away" (1986)
- T'Pau – "China in Your Hand" (1987)
- Jody Watley – "Still a Thrill" (1987)
- Whitney Houston – "I Wanna Dance With Somebody (Who Loves Me)" (1987)
- T'Pau – "Secret Garden" (1988)
- T'Pau – "Only the Lonely" (1989)
