= Whenever You Need Me (T'Pau song) =

Single by T'Pau

from the album The Promise
- B-side: "All the Love"
- Released: 6 May 1991
- Genre: Pop rock
- Length: 4:06
- Label: Siren; Virgin
- Songwriters: Carol Decker; Ron Rogers
- Producer: Andy Richards

T'Pau singles chronology
"Only the Lonely" (1989)	"Whenever You Need Me" (1991)	"Walk on Air" (1991)

"Whenever You Need Me" is a song by English band T'Pau, released in May 1991 by Siren and Virgin Records as the lead single from their third studio album, The Promise (1991). It was written by Carol Decker and Ron Rogers, and produced by Andy Richards. "Whenever You Need Me" reached No. 16 on the UK Singles Chart and remained in the charts for six weeks. It was the band's last Top-40 hit in the UK.

The 7" single's B-side, "All the Love", was a non-album track exclusive to the single. In the UK, a limited edition box-set of the single was issued, featuring the 12" vinyl single and a life-size colour poster of Decker.

A music video was filmed to promote the single. The band also performed the song on the UK music show Top of the Pops, and the UK Saturday morning children show Gimme 5.

== Critical reception ==
Upon its release as a single, Mark Frith of Smash Hits stated, "T'Pau! How tired life was without them. Welcome back indeed! More of the same 'melodic rock' that the nation will be humming for the next three years? Certainly. The charts are over here just where you left them." Peter Kinghorn of the Newcastle Evening Chronicle described the song as "a potent rock ballad." Tonia Macari of the Aberdeen Evening Express praised it as "four minutes of perfected, polished, pop-rock with raunchy red-head Carol Decker's vocals as ear-shattering as ever". He added, "This will no doubt welcome the band back to Chartsville."

Steve Stewart of the Aberdeen Press & Journal gave a mixed review, stating, "T'Pau, if anything, have a knack of composing artful hooklines that strike a chord somewhere. The trouble is Decker's irritating vocals whenever they reach anything above soft-ballad level. Still, a successful mix of keyboard overlays and pop-rock guitars." Music & Media wrote, "Serious comeback of the band who had a huge European hit with 'China in Your Hands' in 1987. This new single sounds as grotesque as melodic." In a review of The Promise, Adam Sweeting of The Guardian described the song as "a Eurovision fourth-placer if ever there was one" with "Decker's masonry-toppling vocals piled up in layers like a particularly indigestible aural lasagne".

== Track listing ==
- 7" single
1. "Whenever You Need Me" - 4:06
2. "All the Love" - 4:00
- 12" single
1. "Whenever You Need Me (Extended)" - 6:15
2. "Whenever You Need Me (Single Version)" - 4:06
3. "All the Love" - 4:00
- CD single
1. "Whenever You Need Me" - 4:06
2. "Heart and Soul" - 3:40
3. "China in Your Hand" - 4:05
4. "I Will Be with You" - 4:06

== Personnel ==
T'Pau

- Carol Decker – lead vocals
- Dean Howard – lead guitar
- Ronnie Rogers – rhythm guitar
- Michael Chetwood – keyboards
- Paul Jackson – bass guitar
- Tim Burgess – drums

Production

- Andy Richards - producer of "Whenever You Need Me", engineer on "Whenever You Need Me (Extended)"
- Ian Taylor - mixing on "Whenever You Need Me"
- Bob Ludwig - mastering on "Whenever You Need Me"
- Steve Williams - additional production and engineering on "Whenever You Need Me (Extended)"
- Chris Lord-Alge - mixing on "Whenever You Need Me (Extended)"
- T'Pau - producers of "All the Love"
- Ian Caple - engineer on "All the Love"
- Roy Thomas Baker - producer of "Heart and Soul", "China in Your Hand" and "I Will Be with You"

Other

- Tony McGee - photography
- An Old Friend with The Graphic Edge - artwork design

== Charts ==
=== Weekly charts ===
Chart (1991)	Peak position
Europe (European Hit Radio)	15
Germany (Official German Charts)	51
Ireland (IRMA)	26
Luxembourg (Radio Luxembourg)	16
UK Singles (OCC)	16
UK Airplay (Music Week)	5

=== Year-end charts ===
Chart (1991)	Position
Europe (European Hit Radio)	97
