= Soul Destruction (song) =

Single by T'Pau

from the album The Promise
- B-side: "Dirty Town"
- Released: 30 September 1991
- Genre: Pop rock
- Length: 3:39
- Label: Siren
- Songwriter(s): Carol Decker; Ron Rogers
- Producer(s): Andy Richards

T'Pau singles chronology
"Walk on Air" (1991)	"Soul Destruction" (1991)	"Only a Heartbeat" (1991)

"Soul Destruction" is a song by English pop band T'Pau, released on 30 September 1991 as the third single from their third studio album, The Promise. The song was written by vocalist Carol Decker and rhythm guitarist Ron Rogers, and was produced by Andy Richards. It peaked at number 79 on the UK Singles Chart.

For its release as a single, "Soul Destruction" was remixed by Phil Harding and Ian Curnow to produce a more dance-orientated track.

== Critical reception ==
Upon its release as a single, Margaret Hussey of The Northern Echo felt that the "dance/rock track" is "not as catchy as their earlier stuff", but still considered it a "good strong song". In a review of The Promise, Alex Henderson of AllMusic noted that "commercial, radio-minded songs" like "Soul Destruction" "begged the question: if American listeners could accept Roxette, why not T'Pau?"

== Track listing ==
7-inch and cassette single (UK)

1. "Soul Destruction" (Remix) – 3:39
2. "Dirty Town" – 3:59

12-inch single

1. "Soul Destruction" (Remix) – 8:02
2. "Soul Destruction" (Album Version) – 3:44
3. "Dirty Town" – 3:59

CD single

1. "Soul Destruction" (Remix) – 3:39
2. "Soul Destruction" (Heavy Bliss Mix) – 3:52
3. "Whenever You Need Me" (Requiem Remix) – 6:22
4. "Dirty Town" – 3:59

== Personnel ==
T'Pau

- Carol Decker – lead vocals
- Dean Howard – lead guitar
- Ronnie Rogers – rhythm guitar
- Michael Chetwood – keyboards
- Paul Jackson – bass guitar
- Tim Burgess – drums

Production

- Andy Richards – production ("Soul Destruction")
- Chris Lord-Alge – mixing (album version of "Soul Destruction" and "Dirty Town")
- Bob Ludwig – mastering ("Soul Destruction")
- Phil Harding – remixing and additional production ("Soul Destruction")
- Ian Curnow – remixing and additional production ("Soul Destruction")
- T'Pau – production ("Dirty Town")

Other

- Mike Owen – photography
- Mark Millington/The Graphic Edge – sleeve design

== Charts ==
Chart (1991)	Peak position
UK Singles Chart (OCC)	79
UK Playlist Chart (Music Week)	46
