= T'Pau =

T'Pau may refer to:

- T'Pau (Star Trek), a character in the Star Trek universe
- T'Pau (band), a British musical group from the late 1980s, named for the Star Trek character
  - T'Pau, the US title for the 1987 T'Pau album Bridge of Spies
- T'pau Almandar, a character from Daniel Keys Moran's novel The Ring
