= Valentine (T'Pau song) =

Single by T'Pau

from the album Bridge of Spies
- B-side: "Giving My Love Away"
- Released: 18 January 1988; 8 February 1993 (re-issue)
- Recorded: 1987
- Genre: Pop rock
- Length: 3:53
- Label: Siren Records, Virgin Records
- Songwriters: Ronnie Rogers, Carol Decker
- Producer: Roy Thomas Baker

T'Pau singles chronology
"Bridge of Spies" (1988)	"Valentine" (1988)	"Sex Talk (Live)" (1988)

"Valentine" is a song by British band T'Pau, which was released in 1988 as the fifth single from their debut studio album Bridge of Spies. It was written by Ronnie Rogers and Carol Decker, and produced by Roy Thomas Baker. It reached No. 9 in the UK and remained on the charts for eight weeks.

A promotional video was filmed to promote the single, directed by Brian Grant. The single's B-side, "Giving My Love Away", was exclusive to the single. For the 12" vinyl and CD versions of the single, a bonus cover version of "I'm a Believer" was included, which featured Rogers on lead vocal.

Speaking to Songfacts in 2015, Decker revealed of the song: "I wrote it about an ex of mine. We would bump into each other after we split and he'd moved on and had a nice girlfriend. We'd smile and say "Hi," but I was still crazy about him so I always had to hide how I felt, and be cool and casual."

In 1993, the song re-entered the charts and reached No. 53 when it was re-issued to promote the compilation Heart and Soul – The Very Best of T'Pau.

When the parent album, Bridge of Spies, was released in 1987, the inner sleeve incorrectly contained the lyrics to the substantially different demo of "Valentine", instead of the eventual recorded version included on the album and released as a single.

== Critical reception ==
Upon release, Karen Swayne of Number One wrote: "This is classic T'Pau – epic, dramatic and incredibly important sounding – and shouldn't harm their career one little bit." Tom Hibbert of Smash Hits commented: "There were some irritating number ones in 1987, but T'Pau's "China in Your Hand" took the biscuit, didn't it? This is not much better. In fact, it's almost entirely the same, though, thankfully, a little less hysterical. Quite bad."

== Formats ==
=== Original release ===
7" single

1. "Valentine" – 3:53
2. "Giving My Love Away" – 3:10

12" single

1. "Valentine" – 3:55
2. "Giving My Love Away" – 3:19
3. "I'm A Believer" – 3:24

CD single

1. "Valentine" – 3:53
2. "Giving My Love Away" – 3:10
3. "I'm A Believer" – 3:24
4. "China in Your Hand (Live)" – 5:49

=== 1993 re-issue ===
7" single

1. "Valentine"
2. "China in Your Hand (Live)"

Cassette single

1. "Valentine"
2. "China in Your Hand (Live)"

CD single

1. "Valentine"
2. "Heart and Soul (Live)"
3. "China in Your Hand (Live)"
4. "Sex Talk (Live)"

== Charts ==
Original release

Chart (1988)	Peak position
Belgian Singles Chart	16
Dutch Singles Chart	17
German Singles Chart	37
Irish Singles Chart	10
Italy Airplay (Music & Media)	1
Swiss Singles Chart	21
UK Singles Chart	9
(UK) North East Top 20	5

1993 re-issue

Chart (1993)	Peak position
UK Singles Chart	53

== Personnel ==
T'Pau

- Carol Decker – lead vocals
- Dean Howard – lead guitar
- Ronnie Rogers – rhythm guitar
- Michael Chetwood – keyboards
- Paul Jackson – bass guitar
- Tim Burgess – drums, percussion

Production

- Roy Thomas Baker – producer of "Valentine"
- Jerry Napier – engineer on "Valentine"
- Ronnie Rogers, Tim Burgess – producers of "Giving My Love Away" and "I'm a Believer"
- Norman Goodman – engineer on "Giving My Love Away"

Other

- Mark Millington – design
- Simon Fowler – photography
- MI5 – management
