= Be Wonderful =

Studio album by T'Pau
- Released: 10 April 2026
- Studios: Up The Lane Recordings, Monmouth
- Length: 35:58
- Label: Gnatfish Records
- Producers: Ron Rogers; Carol Decker; Anthony Clark; Carsten Moss

T'Pau chronology
Pleasure & Pain (2015)	Be Wonderful (2026)

Singles from Be Wonderful
- 1. "Run" Released: 17 August 2018; 2. "Be Wonderful" Released: 8 May 2020; 3. "World on Fire" Released: 4 November 2022; 4. "Miles and Miles" Released: 29 November 2024; 5. "Read My Lips" Released: 20 March 2026; 6. "Casual Remark" Released: 6 November 2026

Be Wonderful is the sixth studio album by English pop group T'Pau, released by Gnatfish Records on 10 April 2026.

== Background ==
Be Wonderful was T'Pau's first new album since 2015's Pleasure & Pain, although the band had released a number of digital only singles between 2018 and 2024. In 2018, they released "Run", which Decker described as "very danceable, very summer, very festival". The singles "Be Wonderful", "World on Fire" and "Miles and Miles" followed in 2020, 2022 and 2024 respectively.

In 2025, lead vocalist Carol Decker and guitarist Ron Rogers decided to record a new album. The pair wrote and recorded six new songs at Rogers' own studio, Up The Lane Recordings, in Monmouth. They also decided to include four of the previously released singles as Decker felt they had "slipped under the radar" at the time of their original release. The single "Guess Who's Sorry Now", released in 2021, was the only one of the band's post-2018 singles not to be included on the album.

Be Wonderful was released independently by Gnatfish Records on 10 April 2026. A single, "Read My Lips", preceded it on 20 March 2026. The album was made available on CD and LP through the band's online store and on their tour. The LP format was limited to 1,000 numbered copies, all of which were signed by Decker. The album cover features a photograph of a 10-year-old Decker, taken by her uncle in the late 1960s. The band embarked on a headline UK tour during April 2026 to promote the album. "Casual Remark" was released as a single on 6 November 2026. An accompanying music video was filmed at the Sound Lounge, London, and was directed by Michelle Fredericks and Alasdair Scott.

== Song information ==
Decker has described "Read My Lips" as being "about pushing back and doing what you feel is right for you" and "overcoming your own self-doubt". The song was originally written and demoed by Decker and Anthony Clark, but was not developed any further at the time. When recording Be Wonderful, Decker presented the song to Rogers, who came up with the chorus. The duo purposely gave "Casual Remark" a Fleetwood Mac feel. "Miles and Miles" was inspired by The Haunting of Bly Manor and "Stupid Love Song" was inspired by the Clinton–Lewinsky scandal of 1998. Decker has described "Say Something" as a "huge ballad".

== Critical reception ==
Professional ratings
Review scores
Source	Rating
Classic Pop	3.5/5 stars
Classic Rock	7/10
The List	3/5 stars
Record Collector	3/5 stars

Upon its release, Claire Sawers of The List stated that Be Wonderful contains "country-tinged, bluesy rock and life lessons", alongside "radio-friendly rock riffs" and "melodic echoes of Fleetwood Mac or Dire Straits elsewhere". She also considered Decker's voice to be "reminiscent of the rich raspy contralto of Amy Macdonald or KT Tunstall". John Earls of Classic Pop noted that the songwriting "remains strong" with variety of a "chameleonic nature", but was critical of the self-production as he felt there is "sometimes a frustrating feeling of how, with a little extra polish, these potential anthems could shine that bit brighter". He picked the "country-tinged" "Casual Remark" and "Stupid Love Song" as two of the best tracks, alongside the "fragile ballad" "Say Something". He also said that "Read My Lips" is the "kind of epic which would have been No. 1 for a month in 1987", and commented on the "earworm" title track's "infectious chorus" and described the "bouncy" "Run" as a "Dido-ish mid-paced bop".

Terry Staunton of Record Collector praised Be Wonderfulas an "assured return, with the potential to catch the attention of listeners who'd long dimissed them as yesterday's news". He described it as ranging from slinky mood pieces, country-soul confessionals to gospel-tinged power ballads, and noted that the "sparky" "Read My Lips" is "full of defiance and early Blondie attitude". Mark Beaumont of Classic Rock said that the album "display[s] a pleasingly strict dedication to the lost art of radio-rock songwriting" and "tread[s] an intriguing line between big-sky country rock and contemporary electronica". He added that "there are moments that are wonderfully, shamelessly T'Pau", including "Showdown", "Echo" and "Be Wonderful". Duncan Barkes, writing for Portsmouth's The News, recommended the album for lovers of 1980s music. He wrote, "The album is a real reminder of the raw talent and songwriting that propelled T'Pau to success in 1987. [It] manages to achieve that rare quality of sounding familiar, yet fresh, at the same time."

== Track listing ==
All tracks are written by Ron Rogers and Carol Decker except where noted.

No.	Title	Writer(s)	Length
1.	"Read My Lips"	Rogers, Decker, Anthony Clark	3:17
2.	"Miles and Miles"		3:10
3.	"Showdown"	Rogers, Decker, Dave Hattee	3:37
4.	"Casual Remark"		3:59
5.	"Stupid Love Song"	Rogers, Decker, James Ashby, Luke Burnet-Smith	3:58
6.	"Be Wonderful"	Rogers, Decker, Ashby, Burnet-Smith	3:42
7.	"Echo"		3:03
8.	"Run"	Rogers, Decker, Carsten Moss	3:42
9.	"World on Fire"		3:53
10.	"Say Something"		3:32

== Personnel ==
Musicians

- Carol Decker – vocals
- Ron Rogers – guitar
- Luke Burnet-Smith – bass guitar
- James Ashby – guitar
- Simon Hunter – guitar
- Anthony Clark – guitar, keyboards
- Carsten Moss – keyboards
- Dean Howard – guitar

Production

- Ron Rogers – production (tracks 2–7, 9, 10)
- Carol Decker – production (tracks 2–7, 9, 10)
- Anthony Clark – production (track 1)
- Carsten Moss – production (track 8)
- Tim Debney – mastering
