= Road to Our Dream =

Single by T'Pau

from the album Rage
- B-side: "Time of Our Lives"
- Released: 7 November 1988
- Genre: Pop rock
- Length: 3:59
- Label: Siren Records
- Songwriters: Ronnie Rogers; Carol Decker
- Producer: Roy Thomas Baker

T'Pau singles chronology
"Secret Garden" (1988)	"Road to Our Dream" (1988)	"Only the Lonely" (1989)

"Road to Our Dream" is a song by English band T'Pau, released in 1988 as the second single from their second studio album Rage. It was written by vocalist Carol Decker and rhythm guitarist Ron Rogers, and produced by Roy Thomas Baker. "Road to Our Dream" peaked at No. 42 on the UK Singles Chart and remained in the Top 100 for seven weeks.

== Music video ==
The song's music video was shot at various sites in Cornwall, including Cornwall Coliseum and Tintagel Castle. The scenes filmed at the Cornwall Coliseum showed the band performing at the venue during final production rehearsals for the "Rage Across Europe" tour. Speaking to This Is Cornwall in 2013, Decker recalled: "We always held our production rehearsals at the Cornwall Coliseum – it's very sad it's gone to ruin and is frozen in time. If you have a look at the video for our single "Road to our Dream" you can see us putting up T'Pau posters at the Coliseum."

== Critical reception ==
Upon its release as a single, Music & Media wrote, "Definitely one of the best tracks from Rage. Much more likely to chart than the rather limp "Secret Garden"." Paul Oldfield of Melody Maker stated, "It's in that vein of American AOR that begins as a lowing of grief though yards of billowing gauze and ascends from there, apart from interludes when a desultory guitar solo or sax is coaxed forth. Whatever some people saw in 'China In Your Hand', it's suffered a massive hernia along the way, and reaches its destination in a support truss here."

Gideon Haigh of The Age commented, "More Proustian observations from Decker. Life's like a road, geddit? It's long and hard, right? Sometimes the struggle may appear futile, but eventually we reach our dream, okay? Goes on for weeks, and this is just the radio mix. Phew." Hannsjörg Riemann of German magazine Bravo gave a three out of three star rating. He said that Decker "comes across as really strong" and noted the "heavy guitars" which "drive" the song. He added, "From the slow tempo one shouldn't conclude that the song doesn't have enough steam under the hood."

== Formats ==
7" single

1. "Road to Our Dream (Edit)" - 3:59
2. "Time of Our Lives" - 3:30

7" single (UK only)

1. "Road to Our Dream" - 4:40
2. "Time of Our Lives" - 3:30

12" single

1. "Road to Our Dream" - 4:40
2. "Time of Our Lives" - 3:30
3. "Call Me" - 3:12

CD single

1. "Road to Our Dream" (Full Length Version) - 4:41
2. "Call Me" - 3:16
3. "Time of Our Lives" - 3:31
4. "Road to Our Dream" (Instrumental) - 4:42

== Personnel ==
T'Pau

- Carol Decker – lead vocals
- Dean Howard – lead guitar
- Ronnie Rogers – rhythm guitar
- Michael Chetwood – keyboards
- Paul Jackson – bass guitar
- Tim Burgess – drums

Production

- Roy Thomas Baker - producer of "Road to Our Dream" and "Call Me"
- T'Pau - producers of "Time of Our Lives"
- Stephen W. Tayler - mixing on "Road to Our Dream"
- Norman Goodman - engineer on "Road to Our Dream" and "Call Me"
- Ben Kape - engineer on "Time of Our Lives" and "Call Me"

Other

- Mark Millington - sleeve design, artwork
- Tim O'Sullivan - photography

== Charts ==
Chart (1989)	Peak position
Irish Singles Chart	24
UK Singles Chart	42
