= Red (T'Pau album) =

Studio album by T'Pau
- Released: 14 September 1998
- Recorded: December 1997–July 1998
- Genres: Pop; rock
- Length: 40:01
- Label: Gnatfish

T'Pau chronology
| The Promise (1991) | Red (1998) | Pleasure & Pain (2015) |

Red is the fourth studio album by English pop group T'Pau, released by Gnatfish on 14 September 1998. Red was the first T'Pau studio album since 1991's The Promise and featured singer Carol Decker as the only remaining member from the original line-up.

== Background ==
In the years after T'Pau's split in 1992, Decker continued writing songs and occasionally performed live as a solo artist. In 1997, she found a new manager, Will Ashurst, who encouraged Decker to record a new album and form a new line-up of T'Pau to begin touring again. As the only remaining original member, Decker considered touring under her own name, but was advised by Ashurst to use the established T'Pau name. That year, the band undertook a 25-date UK tour and also released a new version of the band's 1986 hit "Heart and Soul" as "Heart and Soul '97".

Red was recorded between December 1997 to July 1998 at Roundhouse Studios in London. The album, which was released in September 1998, was supported by a thirty-six date tour. Further promotional activities included a live session for Virgin Radio and an appearance on VH1, which Decker also filmed material for in New York. Later in November and December 1998, T'Pau supported Status Quo on the German and UK leg of their It's Good to Tour. A radio promotional single, "With a Little Luck", was released from the album. Red was not a commercial success, nor was a re-recorded version of "Giving Up the Ghost", which followed in 1999. In a 2011 interview with Old School - Back to the 80s, Decker said: "I would've loved to have gotten the same level of success again [with Red]. It didn't happen although I did sell a lot of albums on the road."

Decker has described Red as having a "stripped down, mellow rock sound". Speaking to The Mail in 1998, she said: "The new album is less bombastic than previous eighties-style arrangements where everything was thrown in. Red is stripped down and is a much more live sounding album."

== Release ==
Red was released in the UK on 14 September 1998 by Decker's own label Gnatfish. It was given a release in the United States on 9 November 1999 by Renaissance Records as a two-disc set, with the additional disc containing three tracks: the re-recorded "Heart and Soul '97", a live, unplugged version of the band's 1987 UK number one hit "China in Your Hand", and the demo version of the album track "Do the Right Dance".

== Critical reception ==
Professional ratings
Review scores
| Source | Rating |
|---|---|
| AllMusic | 3/5 stars |

Upon its release, Dave Ling of Classic Rock called Red a "solid enough comeback album" which shows that "sonically, T'Pau still favour smooth, occasionally faceless walls of melody best exemplified on 'Now That You're Gone' and 'Make Love to Me'". Heather Phares of AllMusic summarised: "The group's smooth pop sounds remain intact on songs like 'With a Little Luck', 'Now That You're Gone', 'Giving Up the Ghost', and 'Let It All Fall'".

== Track listing ==
| No. | Title | Writer(s) | Length |
|---|---|---|---|
| 1. | "With a Little Luck" | Carol Decker, Ronnie Rogers, J. David | 3:40 |
| 2. | "Now That You're Gone" | Decker, Scott Taylor | 3:14 |
| 3. | "Do the Right Dance" | Decker, Rogers, D. Howard | 4:18 |
| 4. | "Wing & A Prayer" | Decker, S. Darlow | 4:00 |
| 5. | "Giving Up the Ghost" | Decker | 4:54 |
| 6. | "Make Love to Me" | Decker, Rogers, R. Feldman | 3:28 |
| 7. | "Say You Will" | Decker, Taylor | 3:08 |
| 8. | "Love Song" | Decker, P. Harvey | 4:36 |
| 9. | "Let It All Fall" | Decker, Darlow | 4:36 |
| 10. | "Sweet Dreams" | Decker, Rogers, J. Dunkley, G. Clayton, S. Boorer | 4:06 |

1999 US CD issue bonus track disc
| No. | Title | Writer(s) | Length |
|---|---|---|---|
| 1. | "Heart and Soul '97" | Decker, Rogers | 3:55 |
| 2. | "China in Your Hand (Live and Unplugged)" | Decker, Rogers | 5:23 |
| 3. | "Do the Right Dance (Demo)" | Decker | 4:21 |

== Personnel ==
- Carol Decker – vocals
- Jez Ashurst – electric guitar, acoustic guitar
- Scott Taylor – guitar (tracks 2, 6–7)
- Spencer Cozens – keyboards (tracks 2, 4–7, 10)
- Kat Evans – fiddle (track 3)
- Dan McKinna – bass
- Dave Hattee – drums, programming on "Love Song"
- Ray Weston – drums (tracks 3, 9)

Production

- Carol Decker – producer (all tracks)
- Rafe McKenna – producer (tracks 1, 3, 8–9), mixing, engineer
- Marco Sabiu – producer (track 1), programming (track 1)
- Ronnie Rogers – producer (tracks 3, 9)
- Simon Dawson, Feddy de Faye, Alan Jenkins, Roberto Pieroni – engineers
- Jeremy Gill, Simon Morris, Peter Sberi – assistant engineers
- Robin – mastering

Other

- Tom Howard – main photography
- Patricia O'Niell – make up
- Deluxe – design
- Wye Media – artwork
