= Just a Dream =

Just a Dream may refer to:

== Music ==
- Just a Dream - 22 Dreams Live, by Paul Weller

=== Songs ===
- "Just a Dream" (Carrie Underwood song), 2008
- "Just a Dream" (Donna de Lory song), 1993
- "Just a Dream" (Jimmy Clanton song), 1958
- "Just a Dream" (Nelly song), 2010
- "Just a Dream", by Nena Kerner from 99 Luftballons, 1983
- "Just a Dream", by Samantha Fox from 21st Century Fox, 1997
- "Just a Dream (On My Mind)", by Big Bill Broonzy, 1939

== Other uses ==
- Just a Dream, 1990 book by Chris Van Allsburg
- Just a Dream, 2002 film starred by Jeremy Sumpter

== See also ==
- "Just Dream", by Carol Decker, 2007
- Only a Dream (disambiguation)
