= Phobia (The Kinks album) =

Studio album by the Kinks
- Released: 29 March 1993
- Recorded: September 1990 – February 1992
- Studio: Konk, London
- Genre: Rock; hard rock
- Length: 76:10
- Label: Columbia
- Producer: Ray Davies

The Kinks chronology
| Did Ya (1991) | Phobia (1993) | To the Bone (1994) |

Singles from Phobia
- 1. "Only a Dream" Released: 1993 (UK); 2. "Hatred (A Duet)" Released: 1993 (Japan); 3. "Scattered" Released: 1993 (UK)

Professional ratings
Review scores
| Source | Rating |
|---|---|
| AllMusic | 2/5 stars |
| The Encyclopedia of Popular Music | 3/5 stars |

Phobia is the twenty-fourth and final studio album by the English rock group the Kinks, released in 1993.

== Overview ==
It is also the only studio album released on Columbia Records label and the only which does not feature drummer Mick Avory in any capacity; though he left the band in 1984, he still played on individual songs on two previous albums Think Visual and UK Jive.

== Reception ==
The album received mixed reviews upon release. AllMusic gave it two out of five stars, stating that "Ray Davies continues to turn out three or four brilliant songs on albums that barely anyone will ever hear." Rolling Stone rated the album four out of five stars, calling it "prime late-model Kinks".

Ray Davies has since expressed displeasure with the album, commenting, "I hated Phobia, the album we did for Sony, because now I see the tempo of all the songs was wrong."

== Track listing ==
All tracks are written by Ray Davies, except where noted.

Phobia track listing
| No. | Title | Writer(s) | Length |
|---|---|---|---|
| 1. | "Opening" | | 0:38 |
| 2. | "Wall of Fire" | | 5:01 |
| 3. | "Drift Away" | | 5:05 |
| 4. | "Still Searching" | | 4:52 |
| 5. | "Phobia" | | 5:16 |
| 6. | "Only a Dream" | | 5:04 |
| 7. | "Don't" | | 4:36 |
| 8. | "Babies" | | 4:47 |
| 9. | "Over the Edge" | | 4:20 |
| 10. | "Surviving" | | 6:00 |
| 11. | "It's Alright (Don't Think About It)" | Dave Davies | 3:34 |
| 12. | "The Informer" | | 4:03 |
| 13. | "Hatred (A Duet)" | | 6:06 |
| 14. | "Somebody Stole My Car" | | 4:04 |
| 15. | "Close to the Wire" | Dave Davies | 4:01 |
| 16. | "Scattered" | | 4:11 |

Bonus track on the European and cassette editions of the album
| No. | Title | Length |
|---|---|---|
| 17. | "Did Ya" | 4:32 |
| Total length: | | 76:10 |

== Personnel ==
The Kinks

- Ray Davies – guitar, keyboards, vocals
- Dave Davies – guitar, vocals on "It's Alright (Don't Think About It)", "Hatred" and "Close to the Wire"
- Jim Rodford – bass, backing vocals
- Bob Henrit – drums

Technical

- R. Douglas Davies – producer
- Kevin Paul, Stan Loubières – engineer
- Richard Edwards – recording
- Bob Clearmountain, John Rollo – mixing
- Christopher Austopchuk, Nicky Lindeman – art direction
- Sue Coe – illustration
