= Walk on Air =

Single by T'Pau

from the album The Promise
- B-side: "Hold on to Love"
- Released: 8 July 1991
- Genre: Pop rock
- Length: 4:34
- Label: Siren; Virgin
- Songwriters: Carol Decker; Ron Rogers
- Producer: Andy Richards

T'Pau singles chronology
"Whenever You Need Me" (1991)	"Walk on Air" (1991)	"Soul Destruction" (1991)

"Walk on Air" is a song by British band T'Pau, which was released in July 1991 as the second single from their third studio album, The Promise (1991). It was written by Carol Decker and Ron Rogers, and produced by Andy Richards. "Walk on Air" reached No. 62 on the UK Singles Chart and remained in the charts for two weeks.

A music video was filmed to promote the single. The 7" single's B-side, a live version of "Hold on to Love", was exclusive to the single and described as a previously unreleased alternate "unplugged"-style recording of the track from The Promise. The 12" and CD formats featured the additional track "Dirty Town", a non-LP song that would re-appear as B-side to the band's next single "Soul Destruction".

== Background ==
Decker was inspired to write the lyrics of "Walk on Air" after a friend's boyfriend was killed in a motorcycle accident. She revealed of the song's message in 2019, "You never know what is going to happen to you. You just never know. Life can turn on a sixpence."

== Critical reception ==
Upon its release, Terry Staunton of the NME commented, "'Walk on Air' sounds not unlike John Waite's 'Missing You', which is fine by me." He added that T'Pau are "no-nonsense pomp rockers who know what they want to do and do it very well". Andrew Hirst of the Huddersfield Daily Examiner picked the song as the newspaper's "single of the week" and praised it as a "fine bout of chartbound chugging melodic rock". Chris Lloyd of The Northern Echo stated, "Carol Decker always contrives to work herself into an over-emotional state in the course of a four minute single. She successfully manages again here, building up to a massive, powerful and pointless chorus." Jan Rowe of the Hull Daily Mail awarded the single a two star rating and called it an "undemanding yet catchy single [which] is a typical example of T'Pau's music". She continued, "Lilting and atmospheric, it chunters away in the background with its standard love lyrics and smoochy sound. Pleasant but not worth buying a new stylus for."

== Track listing ==
- 7-inch single
1. "Walk on Air" – 4:34
2. "Hold on to Love" – 4:33
- 12-inch and CD single
1. "Walk on Air" – 4:34
2. "Hold on to Love" – 4:33
3. "Dirty Town" – 4:03

== Personnel ==
T'Pau

- Carol Decker – lead vocals
- Dean Howard – lead guitar
- Ronnie Rogers – rhythm guitar
- Michael Chetwood – keyboards
- Paul Jackson – bass guitar
- Tim Burgess – drums

Production

- Andy Richards – producer of "Walk on Air"
- Chris Lord-Alge – mixing on "Walk on Air"
- Bob Ludwig – mastering on "Walk on Air"
- T'Pau – producers of "Hold on to Love" and "Dirty Town"

Other

- Tony McGee – photography
- Mark Millington/The Graphic Edge – sleeve design

== Charts ==
Chart (1991)	Peak position
UK Singles (OCC)	62
UK Airplay (Music Week)	23
