= Sex Talk =

Single by T'Pau

from the album Bridge of Spies
- B-side: "Monkey House"
- Released: 8 June 1987; 21 March 1988 (live single)
- Length: 4:43
- Label: Siren Records
- Songwriters: Carol Decker; Ron Rogers
- Producer: Roy Thomas Baker

T'Pau singles chronology
"Valentine" (1988)	"Sex Talk" (1987)	"I Will Be with You" (1988)

"Sex Talk" is a song by British pop band T'Pau, written by Carol Decker and Ron Rogers, and produced by Roy Thomas Baker. It was originally released as a single in 1987 under the title "Intimate Strangers", but failed to chart. It was re-titled "Sex Talk" and included on the band's debut studio album Bridge of Spies (1987). In 1988, a live version of the song, recorded at the SEC Centre on 29 October 1987, was released as a single and reached No. 23 on the UK Singles Chart. This live version of "Sex Talk" was only released in the UK and Ireland. Elsewhere, a 7" remix of the track, "Bridge of Spies", was released instead.

Speaking to eonmusic in 2018, Decker recalled of the song: "I wrote that on my first trip to New York. There were all [these] ads; "Dial Me!" on television, and I just thought; "Wow, that's weird, phone people up and talk dirty"... so I did it, of course!"

== Reception ==
Upon release of the 1988 single, Music & Media wrote: "Another dramatic, pumping, rock track, that has all the chances to hit the charts again." Ben Thompson from NME stated: "I just want to have a laugh, you know how it is, says Carol Decker, the Sarah Ferguson of raunch, and you know she means it." The magazine's Neil Taylor felt Decker "really has got a quite an alluring voice" and that the song "whips up a frenzy of guitars which Carol wades through blasting her six-shooter vocal bullet-fast and bullet-precise." Betty Page of Record Mirror wrote: "T'Pau show their true colours and get down to a full-blooded slice of raunch 'n' roll recorded live, with plenty of guitar drama and Carol Decker giving it her all. It's brave of them to release a live 45, but it does capture the T'Pau live vibe well." In a review of T'Pau (Bridge of Spies), Pete Bishop of The Pittsburgh Press commented: "There's "Sex Talk", which has fake horns and real guitar and would do credit to the Eurythmics, although Miss Decker, a less adenoidal Cyndi Lauper with little body to her strident voice, is no Annie Lennox."

== Track listing ==
=== Intimate Strangers ===
7" single

1. "Intimate Strangers" - 4:12
2. "No Sense of Pride" - 3:52

12" single

1. "Intimate Strangers" - 4:12
2. "No Sense of Pride" - 3:52
3. "You Give Up" (Live) - 3:58

=== Sex Talk (Live) ===
7" single (1988 release)

1. "Sex Talk" (Live) - 3:54
2. "Monkey House" (Live) - 4:13

12" single (1988 release)

1. "Sex Talk" (Live) - 4:34
2. "Monkey House" (Live) - 4:13
3. "You Give Up" (Live) - 3:59

CD single (1988 release)

1. "Sex Talk" (Live) - 4:43
2. "Heart & Soul" - 5:19
3. "Monkey House" (Live) - 4:28
4. "You Give Up" (Live) - 4:10

== Personnel ==
T'Pau

- Carol Decker – lead vocals
- Dean Howard – lead guitar
- Ronnie Rogers – rhythm guitar
- Michael Chetwood – keyboards
- Paul Jackson – bass
- Tim Burgess – drums

Production

- Roy Thomas Baker - producer of "I Will Be with You"
- T'Pau - producers of "No Sense of Pride"
- Norman Goodman - engineer on "No Sense of Pride", mixing on live tracks

Other

- Mark Millington - sleeve design (1987 and 1988 releases)
- Zoe Wilson - front cover photography
- Mauro Carraro - back cover photography

== Charts ==
Chart performance for "Sex Talk"
Chart (1988)	Peak position
Europe (Eurochart Hot 100 Singles)	76
Ireland (IRMA)	21
UK Singles (Official Charts)	23
