= List of Dutch Top 40 number-one singles of 1988 =

These hits topped the Dutch Top 40 in 1988.

Issue Date	Song	Artist(s)	Reference
2 January	No Top 40 released		
9 January	"China in Your Hand"	T'Pau	
16 January	"China in Your Hand"	T'Pau	
23 January	"(I've Had) The Time of My Life"	Bill Medley & Jennifer Warnes	
30 January	"(I've Had) The Time of My Life"	Bill Medley & Jennifer Warnes	
6 February	"(I've Had) The Time of My Life"	Bill Medley & Jennifer Warnes	
13 February	"(I've Had) The Time of My Life"	Bill Medley & Jennifer Warnes	
20 February	"(I've Had) The Time of My Life"	Bill Medley & Jennifer Warnes	
27 February	"(I've Had) The Time of My Life"	Bill Medley & Jennifer Warnes	
5 March	"(I've Had) The Time of My Life"	Bill Medley & Jennifer Warnes	
12 March	"(I've Had) The Time of My Life"	Bill Medley & Jennifer Warnes	
19 March	"(I've Had) The Time of My Life"	Bill Medley & Jennifer Warnes	
26 March	"Get Outta My Dreams, Get into My Car"	Billy Ocean	
2 April	"Tell It to My Heart"	Taylor Dayne	
9 April	"Gimme Hope Jo'anna"	Eddy Grant	
16 April	"Gimme Hope Jo'anna"	Eddy Grant	
23 April	"Gimme Hope Jo'anna"	Eddy Grant	
30 April	"Gimme Hope Jo'anna"	Eddy Grant	
7 May	"Gimme Hope Jo'anna"	Eddy Grant	
14 May	"Yé ké yé ké"	Mory Kanté	
21 May	"Yé ké yé ké"	Mory Kanté	
28 May	"Nothing's Gonna Change My Love for You"	Glenn Medeiros	
4 June	"Nothing's Gonna Change My Love for You"	Glenn Medeiros	
11 June	"Nothing's Gonna Change My Love for You"	Glenn Medeiros	
18 June	"Nothing's Gonna Change My Love for You"	Glenn Medeiros	
25 June	"Nothing's Gonna Change My Love for You"	Glenn Medeiros	
2 July	"Nothing's Gonna Change My Love for You"	Glenn Medeiros	
9 July	"Fast Car"	Tracy Chapman	
16 July	"Fast Car"	Tracy Chapman	
23 July	"Push It"	Salt-n-Pepa	
30 July	"Push It"	Salt-n-Pepa	
6 August	"Push It"	Salt-n-Pepa	
13 August	"Tribute (Right On)"	The Pasadenas	
20 August	"Tribute (Right On)"	The Pasadenas	
27 August	"Tribute (Right On)"	The Pasadenas	
3 September	"Tribute (Right On)"	The Pasadenas	
10 September	"Stop!"	Sam Brown	
17 September	"Stop!"	Sam Brown	
24 September	"Stop!"	Sam Brown	
1 October	"The Only Way Is Up"	Yazz & the Plastic Population	
8 October	"The Only Way Is Up"	Yazz & the Plastic Population	
15 October	"A Groovy Kind of Love"	Phil Collins	
22 October	"Teardrops"	Womack & Womack	
29 October	"Teardrops"	Womack & Womack	
5 November	"Teardrops"	Womack & Womack	
12 November	"Teardrops"	Womack & Womack	
19 November	"Teardrops"	Womack & Womack	
26 November	"Teardrops"	Womack & Womack	
3 December	"Orinoco Flow (Sail Away)"	Enya	
10 December	"Orinoco Flow (Sail Away)"	Enya	
17 December	"Orinoco Flow (Sail Away)"	Enya	
24 December	"Smooth Criminal"	Michael Jackson	
31 December	No Top 40 released		

== See also ==
- 1988 in music
