= How Do I Get Close =

Single by The Kinks

from the album UK Jive
- B-side: "Down All the Days (Till 1992)" (UK); "War is Over" (US)
- Released: 4 October 1989
- Recorded: December 1988 – April 1989 at Konk Studios, London
- Length: 4:23
- Label: MCA
- Songwriter: Ray Davies
- Producer: Ray Davies

The Kinks singles chronology
| "Down All the Days (Till 1992)" (1989) | "How Do I Get Close" (1989) | "Did Ya" (1991) |

"How Do I Get Close" is a song released by the British rock group the Kinks. Released on the band's critically panned LP, UK Jive, the song was written by the band's main songwriter, Ray Davies.

== Release and reception ==
"How Do I Get Close" was first released on the Kinks' album UK Jive. UK Jive failed to make an impression on fans and critics alike, as the album failed to chart in the UK and only reached No. 122 in America. However, despite the failure of the album and the lead UK single, "Down All the Days (Till 1992)", "How Do I Get Close" was released as the second British single from the album, backed with "Down All the Days (Till 1992)". The single failed to chart. The single was also released in America (backed with "War is Over"), where, although it did not chart on the Billboard Hot 100, it hit No. 21 on the Mainstream Rock Tracks chart, the highest on that chart since "Working at the Factory" in 1986. "How Do I Get Close" also appeared on the compilation album Lost & Found (1986-1989).

Stephen Thomas Erlewine cited "How Do I Get Close" as a highlight from both UK Jive and Lost & Found (1986-1989).
