= Only a Dream =

Only a Dream may refer to:

- "Only a Dream" (The Kinks song), 1993
- "Only a Dream" (Zella Day song), 2020
- "Only a Dream", a song by Mary Chapin Carpenter from the 1992 album Come On Come On
- "Only a Dream", a song by Van Morrison from the 2002 album Down the Road
- "Only a Dream", an episode of American TV series Justice League

== See also ==
- Just a Dream (disambiguation)
