= I Will Be with You =

"I Will Be With You"

Single by T'Pau

from the album Bridge Of Spies
- B-side: "Still So in Love"
- Released: 20 June 1988
- Genre: Pop
- Length: 4:05
- Label: Siren Records
- Songwriters: Carol Decker; Ron Rogers
- Producer: Roy Thomas Baker

T'Pau singles chronology
"Sex Talk (Live)" (1988)	"I Will Be With You" (1988)	"Secret Garden" (1988)

"I Will Be With You" is a song by British band T'Pau, released in 1988 from the seventh and final single from their debut studio album, Bridge of Spies (1987). It was written by Carol Decker and Ron Rogers, and produced by Roy Thomas Baker. "I Will Be with You" reached No. 14 on the UK Singles Chart and remained in the charts for six weeks. The 7" single cover picture is a still of Carol Decker taken from the music video to the track, "Bridge of Spies", which had preceded the release of "I Will Be With You" in some international territories.

A music video was filmed to promote the single. The single's B-side, "Still So in Love", was exclusive to the single. The 12" single contained the exclusive track "Thank You For Goodbye Rides Again", which was a re-working of the Bridge of Spies track "Thank You For Goodbye". The CD single bonus track "Walk Away Rene" featured Rogers on lead vocals.

== Critical reception ==
Upon its release as a single, Pan-European magazine Music & Media described the song as "a rock ballad that shows off Carol Decker's voice well" and "a big, overblown pop song that will undoubtedly do well". Tim Nicholson of Record Mirror was critical of the song and predicated a commercial decline for the band. He wrote, "I am pleased to report that this is even duller than the last T'Pau record".

== Track listing ==
7-inch single

1. "I Will Be with You" - 4:05
2. "Still So in Love" - 3:25

12-inch single

1. "I Will Be with You" - 4:05
2. "Thank You For Goodbye Rides Again" - 4:10
3. "Still So in Love" - 3:25

CD single

1. "I Will Be with You" - 4:05
2. "Still So in Love" - 3:25
3. "Thank You For Goodbye Rides Again" - 4:10
4. "Walk Away Rene" - 3:45

== Personnel ==
T'Pau

- Carol Decker – lead vocals
- Dean Howard – lead guitar
- Ronnie Rogers – rhythm guitar, vocals on "Walk Away Rene"
- Michael Chetwood – keyboards
- Paul Jackson – bass guitar
- Tim Burgess – drums

Production

- Roy Thomas Baker - producer of "I Will Be with You"
- Jerry Napier - engineer on "I Will Be with You"
- Ronnie Rogers - producer and mixing on "Still So in Love"
- Norman Goodman - engineer and mixing on "Still So in Love"
- Tim Burgess - mixing on "Still So in Love"

Other

- Mark Millington - sleeve design
- Simon Fowler - front cover photography

== Charts ==
Chart (1988)	Peak position
Ireland (IRMA)	15
UK Singles (OCC)	14
