= Only the Lonely (T'Pau song) =

1989 single by T'Pau

Single by T'Pau

from the album Rage
- B-side: "Between the Lines"
- Released: 13 March 1989
- Genre: Pop rock
- Length: 4:02
- Label: Siren
- Songwriters: Ronnie Rogers; Carol Decker
- Producer: Roy Thomas Baker

T'Pau singles chronology
"Road to Our Dream" (1988)	"Only the Lonely" (1989)	"Whenever You Need Me" (1991)

"Only the Lonely" is a song by English band T'Pau, released in 1989 as the third and final single from their second studio album, Rage (1988). It was written by vocalist Carol Decker and rhythm guitarist Ron Rogers, and produced by Roy Thomas Baker. "Only the Lonely " peaked at No. 28 on the UK Singles Chart and remained in the top 100 for six weeks. For its release as a single, "Only the Lonely" was remixed.

A music video was filmed to promote the single. Numerous formats of this release were issued including 12 inch vinyl, 7 inch vinyl, 7 inch Gatefold Poster Pack, 5 inch CD, and 3 inch CD. Autographed copies were also made available at independent record stores across the UK helping the song climb the charts. T'Pau also performed the song on a number of UK TV shows including Going Live!, Top of the Pops, Daytime Live and The Hippodrome Show.

== Critical reception ==
Upon release, William Shaw of Smash Hits commented: "You have to hand it to Carol and Ronnie. They certainly know how to make records that start off quiet and then get louder and louder. T'Pau have already shown a certain adeptness at turning out crunching great ballads of this ilk, but this time what's so extraordinary about it is Carol's singing. One moment she's singing dainty little harmonies, the next moment she's bawling away like a dame possessed. Marvellous." Pan-European magazine Music & Media wrote: "A song that sees Carol Decker in fine voice which might be a chance for T'Pau to regain their rapidly fading status."

== Formats ==
- 7" single
1. "Only the Lonely" (Guitar Remix) - 4:02
2. "Between the Lines" - 3:35
- 12" single
1. "Only the Lonely" (Nightmare Mix) - 8:00
2. "Only the Lonely" (Guitar Remix) - 4:02
3. "Downtown" (Live) - 3:35
- CD single
1. "Only the Lonely" (Guitar Remix) - 4:03
2. "Only the Lonely" (Nightmare Mix) - 8:01
3. "Between the Lines" - 3:35
4. "Downtown" (Live) - 3:37

== Personnel ==
T'Pau

- Carol Decker – lead vocals
- Dean Howard – lead guitar
- Ronnie Rogers – rhythm guitar, lead vocals on "Downtown"
- Michael Chetwood – keyboards
- Paul Jackson – bass guitar
- Tim Burgess – drums

Production

- Roy Thomas Baker - producer of "Only the Lonely", mixing on "Only the Lonely" and "Between the Lines"
- T'Pau - additional production on "Only the Lonely", producers of "Downtown", mixing on "Between the Lines" and "Downtown"
- Gary Langan - additional production and remixing on "Only the Lonely", producers of "Downtown", mixing on "Downtown"
- Carol Decker, Ronnie Rogers, Tim Burgess - producers of "Between the Lines"
- Stephen W. Tayler - mixing on "Between the Lines"

Other

- Sheila Rock - photography
- Mark Millington - sleeve design

== Charts ==
Chart performance for "Only the Lonely"
Chart (1989)	Peak position
Europe (Eurochart Hot 100 Singles)	86
Finland (Suomen virallinen lista)	29
Ireland (IRMA)	22
UK Singles (Official Charts)	28
