= Just Dream =

Single by Carol Decker
- Released: 2 September 2007
- Genre: Pop
- Length: 3:22
- Songwriter(s): Carol Decker, Ron Rogers

Carol Decker singles chronology
"One Heart" (1995)	"Just Dream" (2007)

"Just Dream" is a song by English vocalist Carol Decker of the band T'Pau, released as a non-album download-only single in 2007. It was written by Decker and T'Pau's ex-rhythm guitarist Ron Rogers. The song was produced by Decker, Rogers and Jez Ashurst.

== Background ==
The single was released as a one-off single from Decker and Rogers, who both wrote the majority of T'Pau's material. Having pursued separate music careers following the break-up of the band in 1991, Decker and Rogers later began writing together again, culminating in the release of "Just Dream". The song was Decker's first release of new material since the 1998 T'Pau album Red, which was recorded by Decker's own re-formed version of the band. It was Decker's first single release as a solo artist since the 1995 single "One Heart". "Just Dream" was released to coincide with T'Pau's 20th anniversary, however it was not a commercial success.

Speaking to This is not Retro in 2007, Decker spoke of releasing the song under her own name, rather than the band's: "I have always wanted to use Carol Decker as I feel that T'Pau was the 6 of us back then but that's over. Since then I was persuaded - against my better judgement - to continue to use the name as it was a known brand." Speaking of the song, she said: "I would love it to be a commercial success but I doubt it will be... that's not to say I don't think the track is good, I think it's great, but I don't have the financial muscle of a big company behind me any more so it is really difficult to actually let people know that the music is out there. I certainly want to try though!"

== Writing and recording ==
Speaking to the Shropshire Star in 2007, Rogers revealed that he had rekindled his musical partnership with Decker after contacting her while he was working on new material in his home-studio. He stated: "I had a basic idea for "Just Dream" and asked Carol if she could add anything to it."

Before the song's release, a video was released of Decker and Rogers talking about the upcoming single. In the video, Decker stated: "I love T'Pau's legacy, it's a privilege to get out and sing those songs, but there's a certain musical expectation we feel if according to T'Pau, and "Just Dream" is a very different track." In regards to the song's lyrics, Decker revealed: "The inspiration for the lyrics on this song were that hinterland as you just fall asleep and you just wake up." Talking about the song's creation and production, Decker commented: "Basically what we did was, Ronnie and I and Jez, who engineered and helped produce it, we just emailed each other. You don't actually have to even get together, you just email an idea and it gets popped on the track, and emailed back to you to listen to in a nanosecond. The great side of the internet and modern technology is that we've got a fantastic song, and we can record it and we can put it out." Rogers added: "We're all working independently and it's all coming together via the web and the emails and stuff. It's quite weird really isn't it?"

== Release ==
The single was released by Gnatfish Records as a download-only release.

== Promotion ==
No music video was created to promote the single.

Decker appeared on the UK TV show This Morning and mimed the song with a group of backing musicians. In addition, a three-minute video was released with both Decker and Rogers talking about the upcoming single. This video also contained footage of Decker recording the song's vocal. Decker promoted the song through TV and Radio Channels, as well as through MySpace.

== Track listing ==
MP3 Single

1. "Just Dream" - 3:22

== Critical reception ==
In 2007, This is not Retro stated: "When I first heard "Just Dream" it started off by sounding totally different to what I was expecting, but by the end I was going 'Of course... it couldn't be anyone but Carol Decker', which is a good trick I think! There's a real dancey-club sheen to the song, particularly at the beginning... it sounds like the track could be given the full dance remix treatment."

== Personnel ==
- Carol Decker – lead vocals, producer, writer
- Ron Rogers - producer, writer
- Jez Ashurst – producer, engineer
