= Only a Dream (The Kinks song) =

Single by the Kinks

from the album Phobia
- B-side: "Somebody Stole My Car"
- Released: 29 March 1993
- Recorded: September 1990 – February 1992
- Studio: Konk, London
- Genre: Rock
- Length: 5:04
- Label: Columbia
- Songwriter: Ray Davies
- Producer: Ray Davies

The Kinks singles chronology
"Did Ya" (1991)	"Only a Dream" (1993)	"Scattered" (1993)

Music video
- "Only a Dream" on YouTube

"Only a Dream" is a song released and performed by the British rock band the Kinks, written by the main songwriter of the band, Ray Davies. The song appeared on their 1993 album Phobia, the band's final LP.

== Background ==
Ray Davies said of the song in a 1993 interview, "I think I kind of found my voice again on 'Only a Dream,' which I wrote on a plane to England after I decided that the album needed to have a little more humanity. It's odd that an artist who's supposed to have been around still gets intimidated by certain things, but I do, and I had to really get myself prepared to do that vocal. The night before I did, I went out and got rat-arsed drunk on wine. I was still shaking when I got to the studio the next morning, and I did the vocal in one take. It's only a pop song, but there's a lot of emotion in it and there's a lot of me in it."

== Release ==
"Only a Dream" was first released as the sixth song on the Kinks' first Columbia album, Phobia. The album was not met with much success, not charting in Britain, and only hitting number 166 in America. Despite the failure of the album, the track was released separately as a standalone single, backed with "Somebody Stole My Car" (another song from the Phobia album). A second single from Phobia, "Scattered", was advertised to follow up "Only a Dream", but was cancelled and eventually released in small quantities to collectors. One year later, Columbia Records dropped the Kinks.

The song appeared on the compilation album Picture Book.

=== Music video ===
Like many other Kinks tracks of the era, a music video was shot for "Only a Dream". Featuring both Ray Davies and Dave Davies, Ray Davies lip-synced the song.

== Reception ==
Louder Than War singled out "Only a Dream" as the highlight on Phobia, impressed by Davies' "trademarks humour, irony, mental anguish, loneliness and unrequited desire, all achieved by using a lift and a fantasy about a woman as metaphors".
