= Secret Garden (T'Pau song) =

1988 single by T'Pau

Single by T'Pau

from the album Rage
- B-side: "This Girl"
- Released: 19 September 1988
- Length: 4:09
- Label: Siren; Virgin
- Songwriters: Carol Decker; Ron Rogers
- Producer: Roy Thomas Baker

T'Pau singles chronology
"I Will Be With You" (1988)	"Secret Garden" (1988)	"Road to Our Dream" (1988)

"Secret Garden" is a song by British band T'Pau, released as the lead single from their second studio album, Rage (1988). It was written by vocalist Carol Decker and rhythm guitarist Ron Rogers, and produced by Roy Thomas Baker. Released on 19 September 1988, "Secret Garden" reached number 18 on the UK Singles Chart and remained in the top 100 for seven weeks.

== Background ==
Speaking to This Is Cornwall in 2013, Decker said of the song: "We had a lot of gay fans because of "Secret Garden", which is about being yourself. Who knew? It's an overused phrase but some of our songs are the soundtrack of people's lives."

== Promotion ==
The song's music video was filmed in Symonds Yat, Ross-on-Wye. The band would also mime the song on the UK TV shows Top of the Pops, Going Live!, and The Late Late Breakfast Show. In Ireland, the band performed the song on The Late Late Show.

== Critical reception ==
On its release, "Secret Garden" was reviewed by Bros, as guest reviewers for Smash Hits. Craig Logan commented, "I really like this. It's rockier than their usual stuff and it's a good tune." Matt Goss added, "Her vocals have really improved on this, great harmonies, much much better vocals." Nancy Culp of Record Mirror wrote, "Leaving behind their girlie wimpo ballads, T'Pau prove that between them, they have more than one set of balls. For a T'Pau record, this isn't bad, even if Carol does sound like Mickey Mouse." Andrew Stephens of The Age stated, "Brisk, tough and energetic, this song goes nowhere particularly inspiring but it is attractive with its basic spiritual emphasis, lying beneath an optimistic, not-too-commercial rock beat." Music & Media wrote, "A fairly good song in a Pretenders mould. Very radio-friendly."

== Track listings ==
7-inch single

A. "Secret Garden" – 4:05
B. "This Girl" – 4:01

12-inch single and Japanese mini-album

A1. "Secret Garden" – 4:05
B1. "This Girl" – 4:01
B2. "You Never Notice Me" (live at Hammersmith Odeon, 30 March 1988) – 4:02

CD single

1. "Secret Garden" – 4:05
2. "This Girl" – 4:01
3. "You Never Notice Me" (live at Hammersmith Odeon, 30 March 1988) – 4:03
4. "Crying" – 3:55

== Personnel ==
T'Pau

- Carol Decker – lead vocals
- Dean Howard – lead guitar
- Ronnie Rogers – rhythm guitar
- Michael Chetwood – keyboards
- Paul Jackson – bass guitar
- Tim Burgess – drums

Additional musicians

- Gary Barnacle – saxophone on "This Girl"
- Peter Thoms – trombone on "This Girl"
- John Thirkell, Simon Gardener – trumpet on "This Girl"

Production

- Roy Thomas Baker – producer (all tracks)
- Stephen W. Tayler – mixing on "Secret Garden", "This Girl" and "You Never Notice Me"
- Norman Goodman – engineer on "Secret Garden" and "This Girl"
- T'Pau – mixing on "You Never Notice Me"
- Jerry Napier – engineer on "Crying"

Other

- Chris West – back cover artwork
- Mark Millington – sleeve design, art direction
- Tim O'Sullivan – photography

== Charts ==
Chart (1988)	Peak position
Europe (Eurochart Hot 100)	55
Ireland (IRMA)	8
UK Singles (Official Charts)	18
West Germany (GfK)	66

== Release history ==
Region	Date	Format(s)	Label(s)	Ref.
United Kingdom	19 September 1988	7-inch vinyl; 12-inch vinyl	Siren	
Japan	21 November 1988	CD mini-album	Siren; Virgin	
