= Scattered (song) =

Single by the Kinks

from the album Phobia
- B-side: "Hatred (A Duet)"
- Released: 8 March 1993 (Europe)
- Recorded: September 1990 – February 1992
- Studio: Konk, London
- Genre: Rock
- Label: Columbia
- Songwriter: Ray Davies
- Producer: Ray Davies

The Kinks singles chronology
"Only a Dream" (1993)	"Scattered" (1993)	"You Really Got Me" (2004)

Music video
- "Scattered" on YouTube

"Scattered" is a song by the English rock band the Kinks. Written by Ray Davies, "Scattered" appeared as the sixteenth track from their album Phobia, and was the band's final original single (only to be followed by reissues of "You Really Got Me" and "Waterloo Sunset").

== Background ==
On its appearance on Phobia, "Scattered" is dedicated to Annie Florence Davies (Ray Davies' mother) and Carol Bryans (a friend of Davies's). Both died due to cancer.

Ray Davies claimed that "Scattered" took ten years to write. Author Thomas Kitts believes that the song was initially inspired by Ray Davies' broken relationship with Pretenders leader Chrissie Hynde.

== Release ==
"Scattered" was first released in Europe as a single in 1993, 21 days prior to the release of Phobia. The song was then released on Phobia as the closing track (except for Japan and the UK, where "Did Ya" was added as a bonus track, making "Scattered" the penultimate track). After the release of the song "Only a Dream" as the debut British single from Phobia, "Scattered" was planned to be the follow-up. Due to the underperformance of "Only a Dream", the "Scattered" single was cancelled, even though advertising for the single had been released. However, "Scattered" eventually saw release as a single in Britain in small amounts in the collectors' market during 1993. One year later, Columbia Records dropped the Kinks. It did not chart.

== Reception ==
Although it was unsuccessful as a single, critics have praised "Scattered" as one of the best songs on Phobia. Thomas Kitts, author of Ray Davies: Not Like Everybody Else, called it "one of [Davies's] most complex lyrics and one of [Davies's] best songs of the 1990s." Rovi Staff of AllMusic cited "Scattered" as a highlight from Phobia.
