= UK Jive =

Studio album by the Kinks
- Released: 2 October 1989
- Recorded: December 1988 – April 1989 (except "Entertainment": June 1981)
- Studio: Konk, London
- Genre: Rock, pop
- Length: 44:11
- Label: MCA (US); London (UK)
- Producer: Ray Davies

The Kinks chronology
Live: The Road (1987)	UK Jive (1989)	Did Ya (1991)

Singles from UK Jive
- 1. "Down All the Days (Till 1992)" Released: 1989; 2. "How Do I Get Close" Released: 1990

Professional ratings
Review scores
Source	Rating
AllMusic	2/5 stars
Blender	1/5 stars

UK Jive is the twenty-third studio album by the English rock group the Kinks, released in 1989. It was the first album in almost three years since the 1986 album, Think Visual.

== Overview ==
UK Jive is the second and last studio album by the band on the MCA and London labels.

It was also the last studio album to feature keyboardist Ian Gibbons who left during the sessions. Gibbons would later rejoin in time for the group's swan song live album To the Bone.

== Track listing ==
All tracks are written by Ray Davies, except where noted.

Side one
No.	Title	Length
1.	"Aggravation"	6:10
2.	"How Do I Get Close"	5:07
3.	"UK Jive"	3:49
4.	"Now and Then"	3:32
5.	"What Are We Doing"	3:38
Total length:		22:28

Side two
No.	Title	Writer(s)	Length
1.	"Entertainment"		4:19
2.	"War Is Over"		3:41
3.	"Down All the Days (Till 1992)"		4:57
4.	"Loony Balloon"		5:03
5.	"Dear Margaret"	Dave Davies	3:27
Total length:			21:42

Bonus tracks on CD
No.	Title	Writer(s)	Length
11.	"Bright Lights"	Dave Davies	3:28
12.	"Perfect Strangers"	Dave Davies	4:27
Total length:			52:08

== Personnel ==
The Kinks

- Ray Davies – guitar, keyboards, vocals
- Dave Davies – lead guitar, vocals
- Jim Rodford – bass, backing vocals
- Ian Gibbons – keyboards, backing vocals
- Bob Henrit – drums, percussion
- Mark Haley – additional keyboards on "Down All the Days (Till 1992)"

Additional personnel

- Mick Avory – drums, percussion on "Entertainment", production
- Alan O'Duffy – assistant to producer
- Joe Gibb, Alan O'Duffy – engineer
- Trevor Rogers – photography
