= The Promise (T'Pau album) =

Studio album by T'Pau
- Released: 10 June 1991
- Genre: Pop
- Length: 50:19
- Labels: Siren (UK); Charisma (U.S.)
- Producer: Andy Richards

T'Pau chronology
Rage (1988)	The Promise (1991)	Red (1998)

Singles from The Promise
- 1. "Whenever You Need Me" Released: 6 May 1991; 2. "Walk on Air" Released: 8 July 1991; 3. "Soul Destruction" Released: 30 September 1991; 4. "Only a Heartbeat" Released: 1991

Professional ratings
Review scores
Source	Rating
AllMusic	2/5 stars
Calgary Herald	B
Music & Media	(favorable)

The Promise is the third album by British pop group T'Pau, released in 1991 by Siren Records in the UK and Charisma Records in the U.S.

== Overview ==
The album reached number 10 on the UK Albums Chart and gave the group two charting singles—"Whenever You Need Me" (a UK Top 20) and "Walk on Air". A third single, a remix of the track "Soul Destruction", failed to make the chart and a fourth single, "Only a Heartbeat", was released only in the United States and Japan. The group disbanded shortly after the release of this album and its singles.

Following on from the cover art for the band's previous albums, the artwork for the release included the word promise rearranged to form a face. Unlike Bridge of Spies and Rage, this face was less predominantly placed.

== Track listing ==
No.	Title	Writer(s)	Length
1.	"Soul Destruction"	Carol Decker; Ron Rogers	3:44
2.	"Whenever You Need Me"	Decker; Rogers	4:06
3.	"Walk on Air"	Decker; Rogers	4:34
4.	"Made of Money"	Decker; Rogers; Dean Howard; Michael Chetwood; Paul Jackson	3:50
5.	"Hold On to Love"	Decker; Rogers; Howard; Chetwood; Jackson; Tim Burgess	4:18
6.	"Strange Place"	Decker; Rogers; Howard; Chetwood; Jackson; Burgess	4:30
7.	"One Direction"	Decker; Rogers	3:59
8.	"Only a Heartbeat"	Decker; Rogers	4:39
9.	"The Promise"	Decker; Rogers; Howard; Chetwood; Jackson; Burgess	3:59
10.	"A Place in My Heart"	Decker; Rogers; Howard; Chetwood; Jackson; Burgess	3:58
11.	"Man and Woman"	Decker; Rogers; Howard; Chetwood; Jackson	4:37
12.	"Purity"	Decker; Rogers	3:47
Total length:			50:19

== Charts ==
Chart performance for The Promise
Chart (1991)	Peak position
European Albums (Music & Media)	50
Swiss Albums (Schweizer Hitparade)	40
UK Albums (Official Charts)	10
