= Bridge of Spies (album) =

1987 studio album by T'Pau

Studio album by T'Pau
- Released: 14 September 1987
- Genres: Pop; pop rock; new wave
- Length: 44:19
- Label: Siren
- Producer: Roy Thomas Baker

T'Pau chronology
Bridge of Spies (1987)	Rage (1988)

Singles from Bridge of Spies
- 1. "Heart and Soul" Released: February 1987; 2. "Intimate Strangers" Released: June 1987; 3. "China in Your Hand" Released: October 1987; 4. "Bridge of Spies" Released: 1987 (US); 5. "Valentine" Released: January 1988; 6. "I Will Be with You" Released: June 1988

Professional ratings
Review scores
Source	Rating
AllMusic	3.5/5 stars
Kerrang!	4¾/5
Record Mirror	2.5/5 stars

Bridge of Spies is the debut studio album by English pop group T'Pau, released on 14 September 1987 by Siren Records. In the United States and Canada, Virgin Records released the album under the title T'Pau.

== Overview ==
The album was produced by Roy Thomas Baker. It spawned five singles—"Heart and Soul" (a top-five entry in the US), the chart-topper "China in Your Hand" (re-recorded especially for single release), "Valentine", a live version of "Sex Talk" (previously released in its original form as "Intimate Strangers"), and "I Will Be with You". A further release, a remix of the title track "Bridge of Spies", was also released in the US, Canada, Australia and Germany.

The artwork for the release includes the name "T'Pau" rearranged to form a face (similar to the Moai stone heads found on Easter Island). This practice was replicated with the titles of the band's follow-up albums Rage and The Promise.

The album spent one week at number one on the UK Albums Chart and was certified Gold on 14 October 1987 and Platinum on 18 November 1987. It was eventually certified four-times Platinum in September 1988.

An extended and digitally remastered version of Bridge of Spies was released in the UK and Europe in 2017. It includes remixes, B-sides and live versions of the album tracks. A companion album called The Virgin Anthology was released shortly afterwards, and this triple CD and DVD contains the radio edits and remixes of all the singles released from Bridge of Spies and digitally remastered versions of the follow-up albums Rage and The Promise.

== Track listing ==
All tracks are written by Carol Decker and Ron Rogers.

Side one
No.	Title	Length
1.	"Heart and Soul"	4:16
2.	"I Will Be with You"	4:05
3.	"China in Your Hand"	5:06
4.	"Friends Like These"	3:45
5.	"Sex Talk"	4:14

Side two
No.	Title	Length
1.	"Bridge of Spies"	5:23
2.	"Monkey House"	4:24
3.	"Valentine"	3:58
4.	"Thank You for Goodbye"	3:54
5.	"You Give Up"	4:39
6.	"China in Your Hand" (Reprise)	0:45

== View from a Bridge ==
A video of the following selected tracks was released as View from a Bridge in 1988 on VHS and LaserDisc.

1. "Intro"
2. "Heart and Soul"
3. "Bridge of Spies"
4. "China in Your Hand"
5. "Valentine"
6. "Sex Talk"

== Personnel ==
=== Musicians ===
- Carol Decker – all vocals
- Ronnie Rogers – guitars
- Tim Burgess – drums, percussion
- Michael Chetwood – keyboards
- Paul Jackson – bass
- Taj Wyzgowski – guitars
- Peter Ballin – tenor saxophone
- Gary Barnacle – tenor saxophone (single version of "China in Your Hand")

=== Technical ===
- Roy Thomas Baker – production
- Jerry Napier – engineering, mixing

== Charts ==
=== Weekly charts ===
Weekly chart performance for Bridge of Spies
Chart (1987–1988)	Peak position
Australian Albums (Kent Music Report)	95
Austrian Albums (Ö3 Austria)	12
Canada Top Albums/CDs (RPM)	17
Dutch Albums (Album Top 100)	6
European Albums (Music & Media)	5
Finnish Albums (Suomen virallinen lista)	32
German Albums (Offizielle Top 100)	7
New Zealand Albums (RMNZ)	6
Norwegian Albums (VG-lista)	1
Swedish Albums (Sverigetopplistan)	11
Swiss Albums (Schweizer Hitparade)	3
UK Albums (Official Charts)	1
US Billboard 200	31

=== Year-end charts ===
1987 year-end chart performance for Bridge of Spies
Chart (1987)	Position
UK Albums (Gallup)	15

1988 year-end chart performance for Bridge of Spies
Chart (1988)	Position
Dutch Albums (Album Top 100)	54
European Albums (Music & Media)	23
German Albums (Offizielle Top 100)	37
Swiss Albums (Schweizer Hitparade)	9
UK Albums (Gallup)	25

== Certifications ==
Certifications for Bridge of Spies
Region	Certification	Certified units/sales
Canada (Music Canada)	Gold	50,000^{^}
Germany (BVMI)	Gold	250,000^{^}
Netherlands (NVPI)	Gold	50,000^{^}
Sweden (GLF)	Gold	50,000^{^}
Switzerland (IFPI Switzerland)	Platinum	50,000^{^}
United Kingdom (BPI)	4× Platinum	1,200,000^{^}
^{^} Shipments figures based on certification alone.
