= Did Ya =

EP by the Kinks
- Released: 24 October 1991
- Recorded: March – June 1991
- Studio: Konk
- Genre: Rock
- Length: 15:06
- Label: Columbia
- Producer: Ray Davies

The Kinks chronology
UK Jive (1989)	Did Ya (1991)	Phobia (1993)

Singles from Did Ya
- 1. "Did Ya" Released: 1991

Professional ratings
Review scores
Source	Rating
Allmusic	3/5 stars

Did Ya is an EP by the English rock band the Kinks, the debut release on the Columbia Records label by the band.

The EP features the title track that was also released as a single.

== Overview ==
The title track was a commentary on romanticisation of the "Swinging Sixties" culture.

The EP features a rerecording of the Kinks' 1968 hit, "Days".

The live version of "Gotta Move" was taken from the show which was the basis for the Live: The Road live album.

"New World" and "Look Through Any Doorway" are new songs.

== Release ==
Did Ya first saw release on 24 October 1991 in numerous different formats. In Europe the EP was marketed as a CD maxi-single. "Did Ya" was also released as a 7" single backed with re-recording of "Days".

"Did Ya" was later included on the Japanese, British, and European versions of the next Kinks studio album Phobia, released in 1993.

== Track listing ==
All tracks are written by Ray Davies, except as noted.

Did Ya EP track listing
No.	Title	Writer(s)	Length
1.	"Did Ya"		4:32
2.	"Gotta Move" (live)		3:12
3.	"Days"		3:26
4.	"New World"		3:21
5.	"Look Through Any Doorway"	Dave Davies	3:51

== Charts ==
Chart performance for "Did Ya"
Chart (1991)	Peak position
US Mainstream Rock (Billboard)	48
