= T'Pau (band) =

English pop band

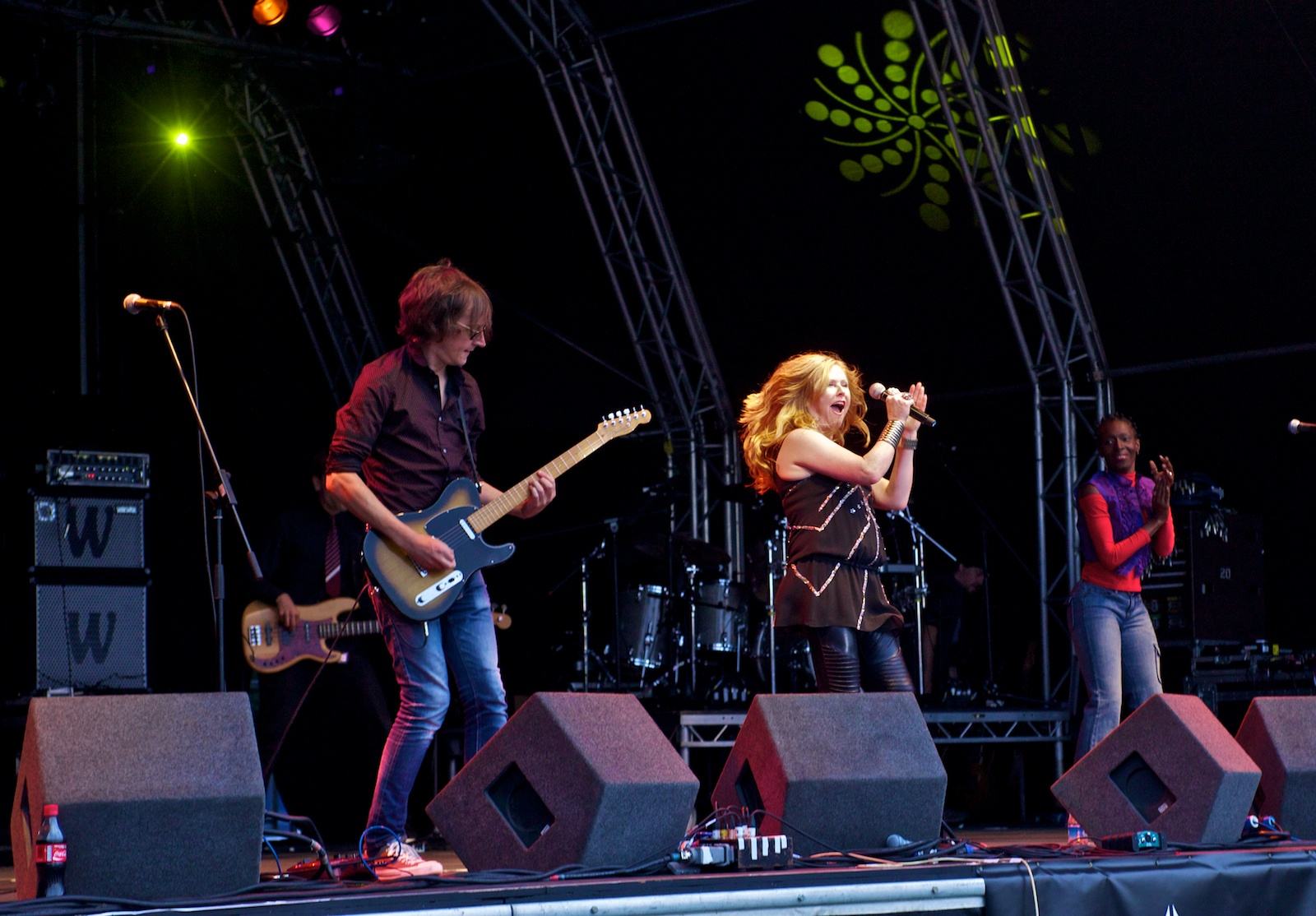
- T'Pau in 2010

Background information
- Origin: Shrewsbury, England
- Genre: Pop
- Years active: 1986–1992, 1998–present
- Labels: Siren, Virgin, Charisma, Gnatfish
- Members: Carol Decker; Ronnie Rogers
- Past members: Tim Burgess; Michael Chetwood; Paul Jackson; Taj Wyzgowski; Dean Howard; Jez Ashurst; Dave Hattee; Dan McKinna
- Website: http://www.tpau.co.uk/

T'Pau /təˈpaʊ/ are an English pop group formed in Shrewsbury, Shropshire, led by singer Carol Decker. They had a string of Top 40 hits in the UK during the late 1980s and early 1990s, most notably "China in Your Hand", "Heart and Soul" and "Valentine", and several hits in the rest of Europe, before disbanding in 1992. Decker still performs under the name T'Pau at solo shows and 1980s nostalgia concerts, and in 2013 she reunited with original band member and co-songwriter Ronnie Rogers for a 25th-anniversary UK tour.

== History ==
The band formed in 1986, taking their name from a Vulcan elder of the same name in the sci-fi series Star Trek. Prior to deciding on this name, they were called Talking America on early demos sent to record and publishing companies.

Their first hit was the 1987 release "Heart and Soul". Initially a flop in the UK, it first became a hit in the US Billboard Hot 100 chart, reaching No. 4 after being featured on a Pepe Jeans advertisement; it repeated the feat in the UK Singles Chart some months later. Their third single, "China in Your Hand", was their biggest UK hit; it became the 600th single to reach number 1 in the UK and spent five weeks at the top spot. It also reached the number 1 in several other European countries but made little impact in the United States. Their debut album, Bridge of Spies (simply called T'Pau in the US), also reached number 1 and went quadruple platinum in the UK. The album produced a total of five hit singles including "Valentine", "Sex Talk" (a live recording of an early flop single, "Intimate Strangers"), and "I Will Be with You".

In 1988 they released their second album Rage, which peaked at No. 4 in the UK and reached platinum status there, but failed to come close to the level of success of the band's debut album the year before. It produced the UK Top 20 single "Secret Garden", though chart returns were diminishing by this point, and two following singles earned very modest success. The third album The Promise followed in 1991: it peaked at No. 10 in the UK, earning a silver disc. It included one Top 20 hit, "Whenever You Need Me", but the band's commercial peak had now passed and they split up after its release. A compilation album, Heart and Soul – The Very Best of T'Pau, was released in 1993 and reached the UK Top 40.

Another greatest hits release appeared in 1997, and Decker reformed the band with a new line-up in 1998, for the release of a new studio album, Red. The record was not a commercial success, but T'Pau have continued to perform live on a semi-regular basis. Two singles "With a Little Luck" and "Giving Up the Ghost" were released from the album. Decker still made guest appearances on TV shows throughout the 2000s, including Hit Me, Baby, One More Time, Just the Two of Us and The Weakest Link. In 2007, marking the 20th anniversary of T'Pau's first success, Ron Rogers and Carol Decker released a new single, "Just Dream", exclusively as an Internet download. In 2008, T'Pau were part of the Here and Now 1980s nostalgia tour.

To mark the 25th anniversary of the formation of the band, Decker and Rogers embarked on a 28-date UK tour during the spring of 2013 without the original band members.

In February 2015, T'Pau released their fifth studio album, Pleasure & Pain, and embarked on a tour. The final eight shows on the Pleasure & Pain Tour had to be cancelled in early March after Decker suffered damage to her voice while suffering from bronchitis. Around the same time, it emerged that she had also grown frustrated at a lack of airplay for her band's new material, as many radio stations were only interested in playing T'Pau's classic hits. In an interview, she stated, "It's a little harder to get on the radio because all the '80s stations play the '80s stuff and they won't play your new stuff. They actually say they can't, and then the younger stations play the younger artists, the hip stations. That's the downside, and I miss hearing radio plays for the new stuff... it is a little frustrating that I can't get it out to the wider audience anymore." Despite this however the album did manage to edge into the charts at No. 98, their first chart action for more than two decades. The band's sixth studio album, Be Wonderful, was released in April 2026.

== Band members ==
Current members

- Carol Decker – vocals, songwriter (1986–present)
- Ronnie Rogers – rhythm guitars, songwriter (1986–1991, 2007, 2013–present)

Touring band members

- Pete Faint – keyboards & Saxophone
- James Ashby – lead guitar
- Luke Burnet-Smith – bass
- Dan Western – drums

Former members

- Tim Burgess – drums, percussion (1986–1991)
- Michael Chetwood – keyboards (1986–1991)
- Paul Jackson – bass (1986–1991)
- Taj Wyzgowski – lead guitars (1986–1987)
- Dean Howard – lead guitars (1987–1991)
- Jez Ashurst – lead guitars (1998)
- Dave Hattee – drums, percussion (1998-2024)
- Dan McKinna – bass (1998)

== Discography ==
=== Studio albums ===
| Year | Title | Peak chart positions | | | | | | | | | | | Certifications |
| Year | Title | UK | AUS | AUT | CAN | GER | NLD | NOR | NZL | SWE | SWI | US | Certifications |
|---|---|---|---|---|---|---|---|---|---|---|---|---|---|
| 1987 | Bridge of Spies | 1 | 95 | 12 | 17 | 7 | 6 | 1 | 6 | 11 | 3 | 31 | UK: 4 × Platinum; CAN: Gold; GER: Gold |
| 1988 | Rage | 4 | — | — | — | 44 | — | 16 | — | 14 | 21 | — | UK: Platinum |
| 1991 | The Promise | 10 | — | — | — | — | — | — | — | — | 40 | — | UK: Silver |
| 1998 | Red | — | — | — | — | — | — | — | — | — | — | — | |
| 2015 | Pleasure & Pain | 98 | — | — | — | — | — | — | — | — | — | — | |
| 2026 | Be Wonderful | — | — | — | — | — | — | — | — | — | — | — | |

=== Live albums ===
- 2003: Greatest Hits LIVE (recorded in 1999)
- 2006: Live in Montreux (recorded in 1998)
- 2008: Greatest Hits Live and More!
- 2014: 25 Live Tour 2013

=== Compilation albums ===
- 1993: Heart and Soul: The Very Best of T'Pau
- 1997: The Greatest Hits
- 2005: Hits (reissue of The Greatest Hits)
- 2007: The Essential

=== Singles ===
Those marked with (V) have a promo video.

| Year | Title | Peak chart positions | | | | | | | | | | | | | Album |
| Year | Title | UK | AUS | AUT | BEL | CAN | GER | IRE | NLD | NOR | NZL | SWE | SWI | US | Album |
|---|---|---|---|---|---|---|---|---|---|---|---|---|---|---|---|
| 1987 | "Heart and Soul" (V) | 4 | 18 | — | 16 | 1 | 10 | 4 | 37 | — | 9 | 20 | 9 | 4 | Bridge of Spies |
| 1987 | "Intimate Strangers"^{[A]} | — | — | — | — | — | — | — | — | — | — | — | — | — | Bridge of Spies |
| 1987 | "China in Your Hand" (V) | 1 | 53 | 5 | 1 | 20 | 2 | 1 | 1 | 1 | 8 | 5 | 1 | — | Bridge of Spies |
| 1987 | "Bridge of Spies" | — | — | — | — | — | — | — | — | — | — | — | — | — | Bridge of Spies |
| 1987 | "Valentine" (V) | 9 | — | — | 16 | — | 37 | 10 | 17 | — | — | — | 21 | — | Bridge of Spies |
| 1988 | "Sex Talk (Live)" (V) | 23 | — | — | — | — | — | 21 | — | — | — | — | — | — | Bridge of Spies |
| 1988 | "I Will Be with You" (V) | 14 | — | — | — | — | — | 15 | — | — | — | — | — | — | Bridge of Spies |
| 1988 | "Secret Garden" (V) | 18 | — | — | — | — | 66 | 8 | — | — | — | — | — | — | Rage |
| 1988 | "Road to Our Dream" (V) | 42 | — | — | — | — | — | 24 | — | — | — | — | — | — | Rage |
| 1989 | "Only the Lonely" (V) | 28 | — | — | — | — | — | 22 | — | — | — | — | — | — | Rage |
| 1991 | "Whenever You Need Me" (V) | 16 | — | — | — | — | 51 | 26 | — | — | — | — | — | — | The Promise |
| 1991 | "Walk on Air" (V) | 62 | — | — | — | — | — | — | — | — | — | — | — | — | The Promise |
| 1991 | "Soul Destruction" (V) | — | — | — | — | — | — | — | — | — | — | — | — | — | The Promise |
| 1991 | "Only a Heartbeat" (V) | — | — | — | — | — | — | — | — | — | — | — | — | — | The Promise |
| 1993 | "Valentine" (V) | 53 | — | — | — | — | — | — | — | — | — | — | — | — | Heart and Soul: The Very Best of T'Pau |
| 1997 | "Heart & Soul '97" (V) | 186 | — | — | — | — | — | — | — | — | — | — | — | — | Red |
| 1998 | "With a Little Luck" | — | — | — | — | — | — | — | — | — | — | — | — | — | Red |
| 1999 | "Giving Up the Ghost" | — | — | — | — | — | — | — | — | — | — | — | — | — | Red |
| 2015 | "Read My Mind" | — | — | — | — | — | — | — | — | — | — | — | — | — | Pleasure & Pain |
| 2015 | "Nowhere" | — | — | — | — | — | — | — | — | — | — | — | — | — | Pleasure & Pain |
| 2018 | "Run" (V) | — | — | — | — | — | — | — | — | — | — | — | — | — | |
| 2020 | "Be Wonderful" (V) | — | — | — | — | — | — | — | — | — | — | — | — | — | |
| 2021 | "Guess Who's Sorry Now" (V) | — | — | — | — | — | — | — | — | — | — | — | — | — | |
| 2024 | "Miles and Miles" (V) | — | — | — | — | — | — | — | — | — | — | — | — | — | |
| 2026 | "Read My Lips" (V) | — | — | — | — | — | — | — | — | — | — | — | — | — | |

- ^{a} "Intimate Strangers" was retitled "Sex Talk" on Bridge of Spies.
