= Heart and Soul (T'Pau song) =

1987 single by T'Pau

Single by T'Pau

from the album Bridge of Spies
- B-side: "On the Wing"
- Released: 9 February 1987
- Genre: New wave
- Length: 4:15 (LP version); 3:42 (7-inch version)
- Label: Siren; Virgin
- Songwriters: Carol Ann Decker; Ronald Phillip "Ron" Rogers
- Producer: Roy Thomas Baker

T'Pau singles chronology
"Heart and Soul" (1987)	"Intimate Strangers" (1987)

Music video
- "Heart and Soul" on YouTube

"Heart and Soul" is the debut single by British pop rock band T'Pau, released in a rerecorded version from their debut studio album Bridge of Spies in 1987. The single reached number four on both the US Billboard Hot 100 and the UK Singles Chart.

== Background ==
Singer Carol Decker said of the authorship and composition of the selection:

Ron had just bought a new keyboard with a built in sequencer, so he was just trying to get used to the gizmos in it and while messing around with the sequencer he started the “bum bum buh buh bum bum bum” of the bass riff. I started to sing a melody over it, the wafty vocal and came up with “more than an ocean keeps us apart.” The lyrics were about when I went on holiday with my parents and Ronnie couldn’t come. I missed him so much, but then I morphed the story into a fictitious one of not being loved back (which I was). The rap was the idea of Andy Piercy, our then producer. He said the gaps needed filling, so I started these syncopated sort of nonsense noises. I then turned those noises into words which took about a week to get right.

== Song information ==
The song is notable for its usage of various vocal overdubs, causing Decker, essentially, to be duetting with herself on the original studio recording. This makes the song, in its initial studio form, impossible to perform live without additional backup singers. Instead, Decker often performs what she calls a "basic" version, explaining to Songfacts: "I rap the first two verses then cut to the melody for the verse before the chorus. No one really notices or minds as I cover the essential dynamics of the song. It works well."

Upon its initial release in the UK in February 1987, the song was not well received, entering the bottom of the chart and falling out immediately after. But in the United States, the song received heavy airplay, and enabled it to reach No. 4 on the Billboard Hot 100 in August 1987. Due to the exposure, the song was re-released in the UK that same month; this time it became a hit, equaling the US peak of No. 4 in September.

There are two different versions of the Music Video, one made later than the other.

== Packaging and title ==
The single artwork was designed by graphic designer Adrian Fry.

== Charts ==
=== Weekly charts ===
Weekly chart performance for "Heart and Soul"
Chart (1987)	Peak position
Australia (Kent Music Report)	18
Belgium (Ultratop 50 Flanders)	16
Canada Top Singles (RPM)	1
Europe (European Hot 100 Singles)	13
Ireland (IRMA)	4
Netherlands (Dutch Top 40)	34
Netherlands (Single Top 100)	37
New Zealand (Recorded Music NZ)	9
South Africa (Springbok Radio)	18
Sweden (Sverigetopplistan)	20
Switzerland (Schweizer Hitparade)	9
UK Singles (Official Charts)	4
US Billboard Hot 100	4
US 12-inch Singles Sales (Billboard)	15
US Dance Club Play (Billboard)	13
US Cash Box Top 100 Singles	4
US Contemporary Hit Radio (Radio & Records)	4
West Germany (GfK)	10

Weekly chart performance for "Heart and Soul '97"
Chart (1997)	Peak position
UK Singles (OCC)	186

=== Year-end charts ===
Year-end chart performance for "Heart and Soul"
Chart (1987)	Position
Australia (Kent Music Report)	86
Canada Top Singles (RPM)	15
UK Singles (Gallup)	47
US Billboard Hot 100	33
US Cash Box Top 100 Singles	38
