= China in Your Hand =

1987 single by T'Pau

Single by T'Pau

from the album Bridge of Spies
- B-side: "No Sense of Pride"
- Released: 12 October 1987
- Genre: Pop
- Length: 5:06 (album version); 4:07 (single edit)
- Label: Siren; Virgin
- Songwriters: Carol Decker; Ron Rogers
- Producers: Ron Rogers; Tim Burgess (single edit); Roy Thomas Baker (12″/album version)

T'Pau singles chronology
"Heart and Soul" (1987)	"China in Your Hand" (1987)	"Bridge of Spies" (1988)

Music video
- "China in Your Hand" on YouTube

"China in Your Hand" is a song by English pop group T'Pau from their debut studio album, Bridge of Spies (1987). A re-recorded version was released as a single in October 1987, spending five weeks at number one on the UK Singles Chart. "China in Your Hand" was the 600th single to top the UK chart. The song also reached number one in Belgium, Iceland, Ireland, the Netherlands, Norway and Switzerland. In 2015, the song was voted by the British public as the nation's 11th favourite 1980s number one in a poll for ITV, and in 2017 was chosen by The Daily Telegraph as one of the 21 best power ballads.

== Background ==
The song's lyrics refer to the novel Frankenstein and its author Mary Shelley. This is more readily heard on the longer album version of the song, as the re-recorded single edit omits most of the more obvious references to the book. The song's title was more unclear however and when quizzed, co-writer Ron Rogers was unsure of its source material. Lyric writer Carol Decker explained that it is the effect that if you hold a china cup to a light, you can see your hand through it – therefore "china in your hand" means something that is transparent. In a segment on the BBC1's The One Show on 6 March 2014, Carol Decker explained that she had been holding a china tea cup belonging to Ronnie Rogers' mother in her hand while washing up and had felt a lump in the bottom. She held the cup to the light and saw an image of a young woman in the base of the cup. Decker had the cup with her and showed the viewers the image.

The song is in the key of B-Flat major on the original album version, but the radio edit version is slightly sped up to reduce its length, resulting in the tuning being midway between B-Flat and B Major.

== Other versions ==
In 2011, contestant Amelia Lily performed the song on series 8 of UK's The X Factor. Judge Gary Barlow said it was "nice to hear the song being sung in tune for once", in mockery of Decker, who reacted to the comment via Twitter. Barlow later apologised.

British synthwave band Gunship released a cover for the song in December 2024, featuring Tim Cappello.

== Track listings ==
- 7-inch single

A. "China in Your Hand" (Carol Decker, Ron Rogers) – 4:07 (Sax solo by Gary Barnacle: guitarist Dean Howard)
B. "No Sense of Pride" (T'Pau) – 3:25

- 12-inch single

A1. "China in Your Hand" (album version) (5:06)
B1. "China in Your Hand" (single edit) – 4:07
B2. "No Sense of Pride" – 3:25

== Charts ==
=== Weekly charts ===
Weekly chart performance for "China in Your Hand"
Chart (1987–1988)	Peak position
Australia (Kent Music Report)	53
Austria (Ö3 Austria Top 40)	5
Belgium (Ultratop 50 Flanders)	1
Canada Top Singles (RPM)	20
Europe (European Hot 100 Singles)	2
Finland (Suomen virallinen lista)	4
France (SNEP)	44
Iceland (Íslenski Listinn Topp 10)	1
Ireland (IRMA)	1
Netherlands (Dutch Top 40)	1
Netherlands (Single Top 100)	1
New Zealand (Recorded Music NZ)	8
Norway (VG-lista)	1
South Africa (Springbok Radio)	12
Sweden (Sverigetopplistan)	5
Switzerland (Schweizer Hitparade)	1
UK Singles (Official Charts)	1
West Germany (GfK)	2

=== Year-end charts ===
1987 year-end chart performance for "China in Your Hand"
Chart (1987)	Position
UK Singles (Gallup)	5

1988 year-end chart performance for "China in Your Hand"
Chart (1988)	Position
Belgium (Ultratop 50 Flanders)	21
Europe (European Hot 100 Singles)	65
Netherlands (Dutch Top 40)	44
Netherlands (Single Top 100)	44
New Zealand (RIANZ)	47
Switzerland (Schweizer Hitparade)	11
West Germany (Media Control)	36

== Certifications ==
Certifications for "China in Your Hand"
Region	Certification	Certified units/sales
Germany (BVMI)	Gold	250,000^{^}
Netherlands (NVPI)	Gold	75,000^{^}
United Kingdom (BPI)	Gold	500,000^{^}
^{^} Shipments figures based on certification alone.

== See also ==
- List of number-one singles from the 1980s (UK)
- List of number-one hits in Norway
- List of number-one hits of 1987 (Switzerland)
- List of Dutch Top 40 number-one singles of 1988
