= Dean Howard (musician) =

British musician

Dean Howard (born 7 May 1961, Greenwich, London) is a guitarist who was part of Ian Gillan's backing band on the Deep Purple frontman's U.S. solo tour in August and September 2006. Dean was working with Toby Jepson (ex Little Angels), and was with Air Race.

== Career ==
Howard first came into the public eye in the 1980s when he joined the pop/rock band T'Pau, fronted by the singer Carol Decker. Howard joined after their debut album Bridge of Spies was released and original lead guitarist, Taj Wyzgowski, had departed. He added a more heavy rock style of guitar work which was first featured on the re-recording of one of the tracks from Bridge of Spies, "China in Your Hand". This subsequently stayed at number one in the UK single charts for five weeks and was the band's biggest hit. He remained lead guitarist on the group's next two albums, Rage and The Promise, but has not been involved with the more recent incarnations of the band.

His post-T'Pau work includes the 2004 album, Volume One, which was written and recorded in two weeks at Rogue Studios, co-written by David Domminney (guitar/vocals), Andres Luengo (drums) and Russell Kennedy (bass) also featured guest vocals from Ian Gillan, Danny Bowes and Toby Jepson.

Howard has been a permanent member of the Rock band Cats In Space since their formation in 2015 Dean has two children: Ricky 'The Ginger Bass Machine' Howard and Ronnie Howard.

== Musical history ==
- Ore
- Frankie & The Bigshots
- Black Alice
- T'Pau
- The Herbs
- Bad Company
- Ian Gillan
- David Domminney
- Toby Jepson
- Air Race
- CATS in SPACE
