= Carol Decker =

British singer (born 1957)

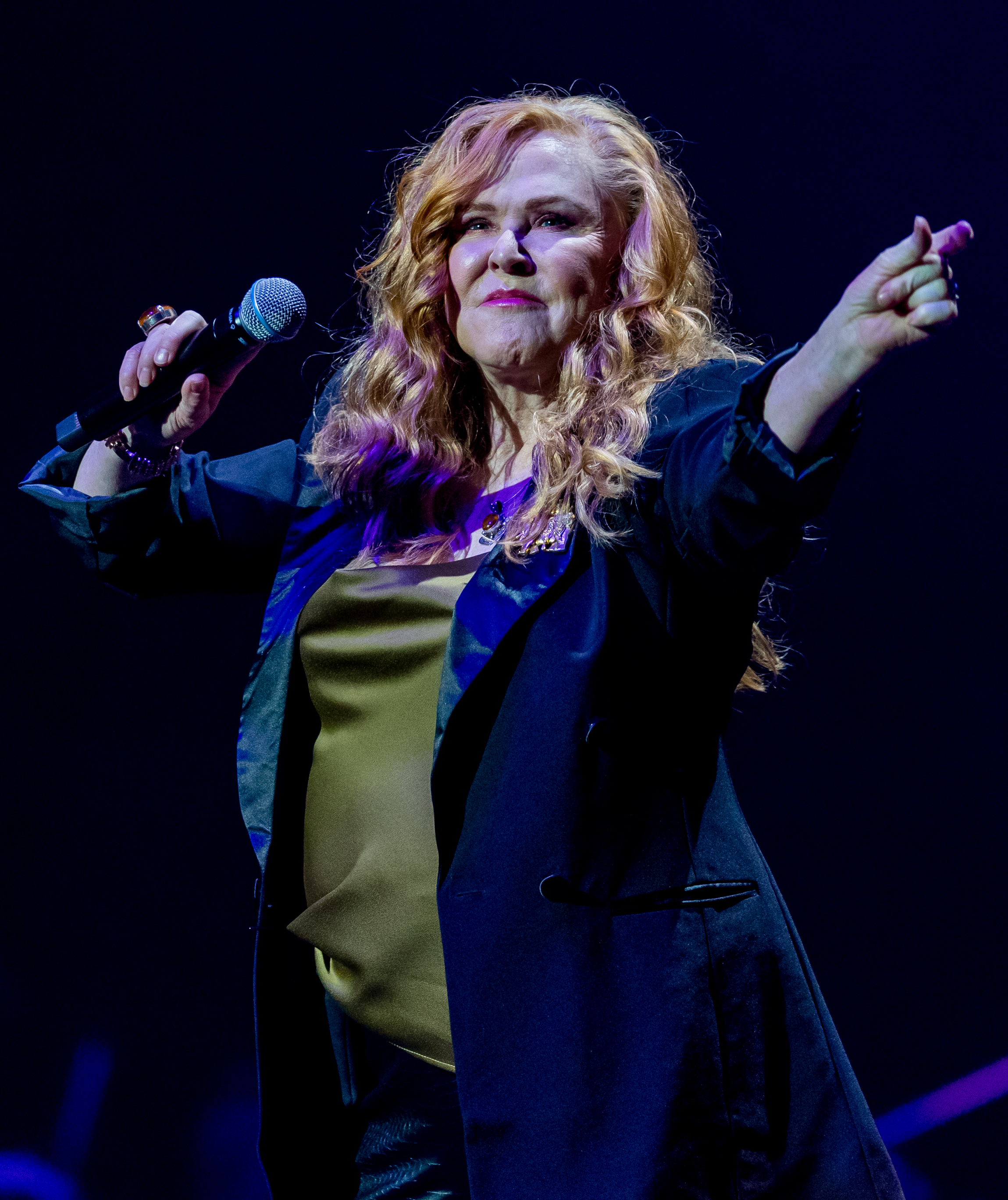
- Decker in 2022

Background information
- Born: Carol Ann Decker; 10 September 1957 (age 69); Liverpool, Lancashire, England
- Genres: Pop; pop rock; new wave
- Occupation: Singer
- Years active: 1986–present
- Labels: Siren; Virgin; Charisma; Gnatfish
- Member of: T'Pau

Carol Ann Decker (born 10 September 1957) is an English singer. She is the lead vocalist of the pop band T'Pau, which had international success in the late 1980s and early 1990s. Although Decker is mainly associated with the group, she also released "One Heart", a solo single, in 1995, and sometimes performs solo at shows and festivals.

Decker's personal record label is GnatFish.

== Life and career ==
Carol Ann Decker was born on 10 September 1957 in Liverpool, Lancashire (now Merseyside) and attended Wellington Girls' High School, Wellington, Shropshire.

In addition to her musical achievements, Decker has also acted on both stage and screen, including the role of Steven Berkoff's wife in the 2002 film 9 Dead Gay Guys. Her television appearances include Hit Me, Baby, One More Time (in which she reached the final round, ultimately being beaten by Shakin' Stevens). Decker also appeared in the British comedy series Trigger Happy TV, in which she appeared in a "bull in a china shop" sketch (the joke being that she had previously had a hit with the song "China in Your Hand"), and in another sketch where she accompanied Dom Joly as he pretended to be a door-to-door salesman.

In 2003 she appeared in the play Mum's The Word (written by Linda A Carson, Jill Daum, Alison Kelly, Robin Nichol, Barbara Pollard and Deborah Williams) at the Albery Theatre in London.

Decker took part in the prime time BBC One show Just the Two of Us, which began on 2 January 2007. However, despite singing duets with Beverley Knight, Tony Christie and Natasha Hamilton, she and her singing partner Gregg Wallace were the first to be eliminated from the show after singing The Jacksons' "Blame It on the Boogie".

Decker appeared in the video for Peter Kay and Matt Lucas's charity single "I'm Gonna Be (500 Miles)" for Comic Relief's Red Nose Day 2007. She released the single "Just Dream" in download-only format in September 2007.

Decker made guest appearances as herself in the British sitcoms Benidorm and Mandy in 2018 and 2019, respectively.

In 2022, she released an autobiography titled Heart And Soul.

In 2025, Decker participated in the sixth series of The Masked Singer as "Tattoo", and was eliminated in the fourth episode.

== Personal life ==
T'Pau member Ronnie Rogers was her boyfriend during their greatest success, and they co-wrote the majority of the band's songs.

Decker began a relationship with restaurateur Richard Coates in 1996. They have two children, and were married in 2006. That same year, Decker became a joint tenant of the Cherry Tree Inn at Stoke Row near Henley, which Coates had established. Although it closed in 2012, it has since reopened under new ownership. The couple live in Henley-on-Thames.

== Solo discography ==
- "One Heart" (1995) CD and cassette single
- "Just Dream" (2007) MP3 single
- "Don't Stop Believin'" (2008) MP3 single
- "We Will Remember Them" (2009) CD/DVD single – all-star for Royal British Legion
